= William Grigsby McCormick =

American businessman (1851–1941)

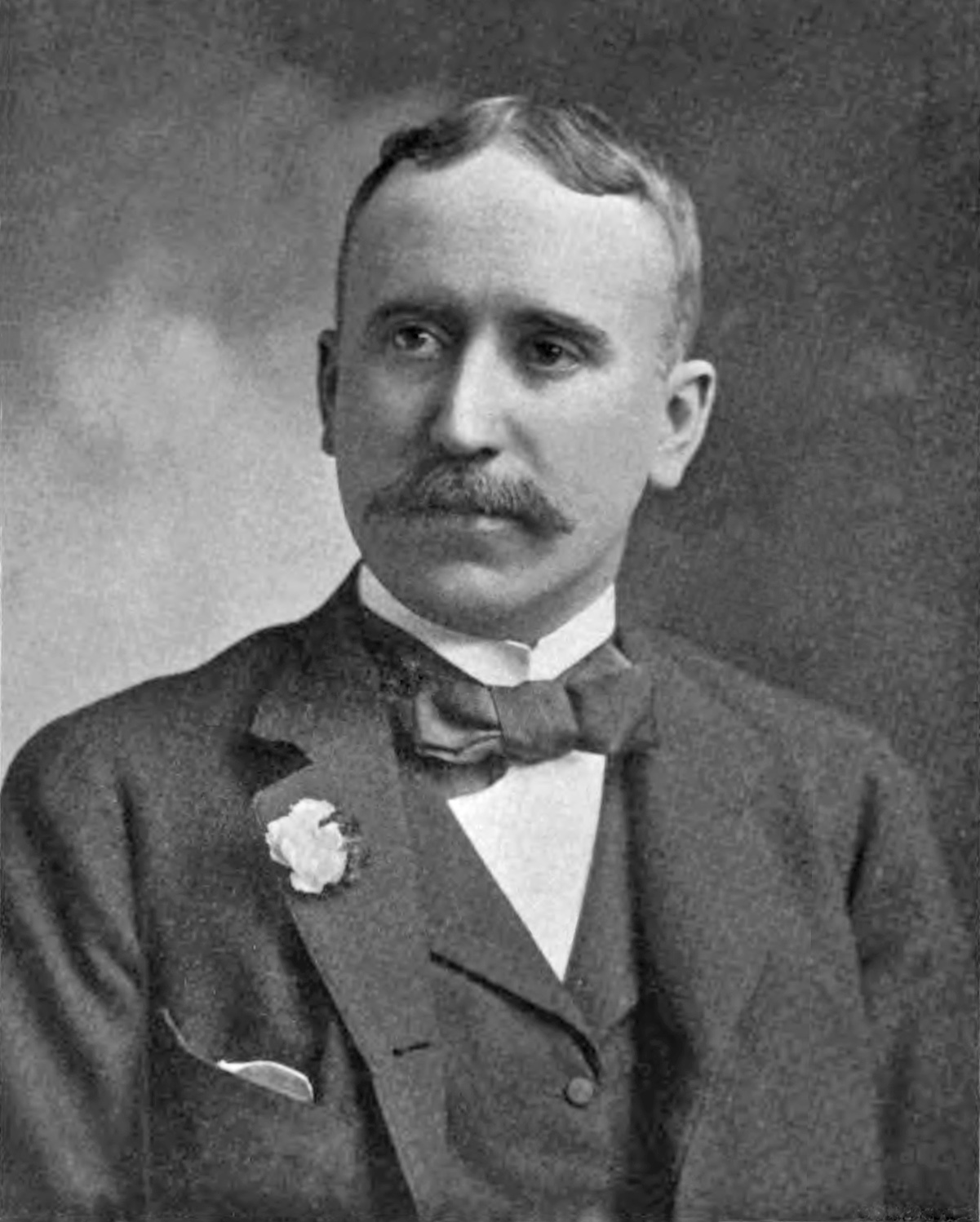

Chicago Alderman from the 18th Ward
- In office 1879–1881 Serving with Julius Jonas (1879–1880); August H. Burley (1880–1881)
- Preceded by: James H.B. Daly
- Succeeded by: Frank M. Blair

Personal details
- Born: June 3, 1851 Chicago, Illinois
- Died: November 29, 1941 (aged 90)
- Spouse: Eleanor Brooks
- Children: 7, including Chauncey McCormick
- Parent(s): William Sanderson McCormick; Mary Ann Grigsby
- Occupation: Businessman

Plaque on his college residence

William Grigsby McCormick (June 3, 1851 – November 29, 1941) was an American businessman of the influential McCormick family in Chicago, who was a co-founder of Kappa Sigma fraternity. He also served as a Chicago alderman.

== Early life and education ==
William Grigsby McCormick was born June 3, 1851, in Chicago, Illinois to William Sanderson McCormick (1815–1865) of the McCormick family and Mary Ann Grigsby (1828–1878). His father managed finances for the family agricultural machinery business which became International Harvester until he died in an insane asylum in 1865. His mother then moved the family back to Baltimore, Maryland, near her Virginia family estate. After she was widowed, Mary had sold her share of the family business to his uncle Cyrus McCormick. Through his elder brother Robert Sanderson McCormick (1849–1919), he was a brother-in-law of Katherine Medill and the uncle of Chicago Tribune publisher Robert R. McCormick.

=== Kappa Sigma ===
He attended the University of Virginia in 1868 and 1869, where he founded the Kappa Sigma fraternity with four other friends on December 10, 1869. A plaque was later affixed to his 1869 room, which was numbered 46 East Lawn, where the first Kappa Sigma meeting was held.

Mccormick's favorite drink was scotch whiskey. He was a guest at the fraternity house named for the family in 1916. The area is now a complex known as the McCormick Road Residence Area. He died on November 29, 1941, at the family estate known as St. James Farm near Wheaton, Illinois. At the time Kappa Sigma was the fourth largest fraternity in the country.

== Career ==
First, he left the university of Virginia in May 1870 and traveled with brother Robert to Europe, returning to Baltimore in November. He worked for two years as a banker for John Sterett Gittings (1798-1879).

In February 1875, after taking a year of travel with his new wife, and then living for a few months in Baltimore, they moved to Chicago. He first worked for McCormick Brothers & Findlay, and then started his own business selling insurance and real estate, with offices in Chicago and New York City. He was elected as a Democrat to the Chicago City Council as alderman, being elected in 1880 to represent the 18th ward for one term.

In 1884, he formed the partnership Smith, McCormick & Company to trade commodities on the Chicago Board of Trade. He became a member of the New York Stock Exchange in 1885. The business became part of the Schwartz, Dupee & Company stock trading firm (with partners Gustavus Schwartz and John Dupee, Jr.). He worked for them until the panic of 1893. He then formed a partnership of Price, McCormick & Company with Theodore Hazeltine Price on March 18, 1895. After some initial success, the firm ran into trouble in a failed attempt to take over Hanover Insurance in 1899. He retired after that firm failed on May 24, 1900, due to a steep drop in the prices of cotton futures contracts. Besides losing his own money, it was reported another backer was George Crocker, son of San Francisco banker Charles Crocker.

== Personal life ==
On October 23, 1873, he married Eleanor Brooks at the Brown Memorial Presbyterian Church in Baltimore. His wife was daughter of former railroad executive Walter B. Brooks. Together, they had seven children:

1. Carrie McCormick (b. 1874)
2. William S. McCormick (1875-1881), died as a child
3. Mary Grigsby McCormick (1878-1955), who in 1900 married Herbert Stuart Stone (son of Melville Elijah Stone whose family had founded the Chicago Daily News).
4. Walter Brooks McCormick (b. 1880).
5. Eleanor Harryman McCormick (b. 1882).
6. Chauncey Brooks McCormick (1884–1954) was the father of Brooks McCormick (1917–2006) who was the last McCormick to lead the family firm, then called International Harvester.
7. Reubenia ("Ruby") McCormick (b. 1891).

== Family tree ==
McCormick Chicago family tree

Robert McCormick Jr. (1780–1846)	Mary Ann Hall (1780–1853)
Nancy Fowler (1835–1923)	Cyrus Hall McCormick Sr. (1809–1884)	William Sanderson McCormick (1815–1865)	Mary Ann Grigsby (1828–1878)	Leander James McCormick (1819–1900)
Cyrus Hall McCormick Jr. (1859–1936)	Anita McCormick Blaine (1866–1954)	Harold Fowler McCormick (1872–1941)	Robert Sanderson McCormick (1849–1919)	William Grigsby McCormick (1851–1941)	Anna Reubenia McCormick (1860–1917)	Leander Hamilton McCormick (1859–1934)
Joseph Medill McCormick (1877–1925)	Ruth Hanna (1880–1944)	Robert Rutherford McCormick (1880–1955)	Chauncey Brooks McCormick (1884–1954)	William McCormick Blair Sr. (1884–1982)
Bazy Tankersley (1921-2013)	Hope Baldwin (1919–1993)	Brooks McCormick (1917–2006)	William McCormick Blair Jr. (1916–2015)

Notes:

See Chaim M. Rosenberg, The International Harvester Company: A History of the Founding Families and Their Machines (McFarland, 2019). online
