= Chauncey McCormick =

American businessman (1884–1954)

Chauncey Brooks McCormick
- Born: December 7, 1884
- Died: September 8, 1954 (aged 69); Seal Harbor, Maine
- Occupations: Businessman, Art collector
- Spouse: Marion Deering (m. 1914)
- Children: 3, including Brooks McCormick
- Parent(s): William Grigsby McCormick; Eleanor Brooks

Chauncey Brooks McCormick (December 7, 1884 – September 8, 1954) was an American businessman and art collector in the McCormick family.

== Life ==
His mother was Eleanor Brooks, daughter of Walter Brooks of Baltimore. His father was William Grigsby McCormick (1851–1941), whose father William Sanderson McCormick (1815–1865) was one of the founders of McCormick Harvester, which merged in 1902 with the Deering Harvester Company founded by William Deering and others to form International Harvester Corporation. His father founded Kappa Sigma fraternity, and owned insurance and real estate businesses before becoming a member of the New York Stock Exchange. Chauncey Brooks McCormick was born December 7, 1884, the sixth of seven children.

He attended Groton School and graduated from Yale University in 1907. During the summer of 1905 he worked as a common laborer in the McCormick factory. After graduation he worked for the Paris office of International Harvester. In 1907 he was gored by a wild elk while on the private game preserve of Percy Raymond Greist.

On July 6, 1914, McCormick married Charles Deering's daughter Marion Deering (1886–1965) in Paris. When the engagement was announced in June, her parents objected because "McCormick did not take life seriously enough". After a civil ceremony, the religious rite required in France was held at her uncle James Deering's Paris residence. The couple was still in France when it became involved in World War I in August. He joined the American Expeditionary Forces with the rank of captain, using his connections to supply food and medical supplies to refugees. In 1918 Herbert Hoover sent him to Poland to organize aid there. France awarded the Croix de guerre for his services.

After the war they moved to St. James Farm in DuPage County, Illinois, west of Chicago near modern Warrenville, Illinois. It was just south of the estate of his cousin Robert Rutherford "Colonel" McCormick (1880–1955) called Cantigny. In 1925 he became a trustee of the Art Institute of Chicago, and became president in 1944. In 1927 he became chairman of the art committee for the 1933 world's fair known as the Century of Progress, and arranged for "the biggest, most comprehensive, most valuable loan exhibition ever assembled in the U. S." Financial problems associated with the Great Depression threatened to reduce the effort to showing popular pictures that would pay off expenses. McCormick used his connections instead to lobby for displaying the most important works he could find. They included James Abbott McNeill Whistler's portrait of his mother known as Whistler's Mother, which was sent from the Louvre with an armed guard of US troops for a tour that included a stop at the Chicago fair. On June 10, 1929, he purchased (with cousin Robert) the estate originally built around 1822 by his great grandfather Reuben Grigsby (1780–1863) known as Hickory Hill.

McCormick was a member of the International Harvester Board of Directors from 1936 until his death in 1954. Although he never ran for public office, he was a delegate to the 1936 Republican National Convention. During World War II he was Chairman of the Commission for Polish Relief, and also worked on reconstruction efforts of Poland after the war. He died on September 8, 1954, while at a vacation home in Seal Harbor, Maine, and left his papers to the Newberry Library.

His widow Marion McCormick also became a patron of art in Chicago and "one of the nation's richest women" when she died in 1965. Their son Brooks McCormick (1917–2006) was the last family member to head International Harvester. Two other sons were C. Deering McCormick and Roger McCormick. The Warrenville estate is now the St. James Farm Forest Preserve, at 41°50′2″N 88°9′39″W. One of their paintings, Femme aux Bras Croisés (Woman With Crossed Arms) by Pablo Picasso from his blue period, was auctioned off for US$55 million in 2000. Marion's sister Barbara Deering (1888–1987) married Richard Ely Danielson and also donated works to the Art Institute of Chicago.

=== Family tree ===
McCormick Chicago family tree

Robert McCormick Jr. (1780–1846) | Mary Ann Hall (1780–1853)
Nancy Fowler (1835–1923) | Cyrus Hall McCormick Sr. (1809–1884) | William Sanderson McCormick (1815–1865) | Mary Ann Grigsby (1828–1878) | Leander James McCormick (1819–1900)
Cyrus Hall McCormick Jr. (1859–1936) | Anita McCormick Blaine (1866–1954) | Harold Fowler McCormick (1872–1941) | Robert Sanderson McCormick (1849–1919) | William Grigsby McCormick (1851–1941) | Anna Reubenia McCormick (1860–1917) | Leander Hamilton McCormick (1859–1934)
Joseph Medill McCormick (1877–1925) | Ruth Hanna (1880–1944) | Robert Rutherford McCormick (1880–1955) | Chauncey Brooks McCormick (1884–1954) | William McCormick Blair Sr. (1884–1982)
Bazy Tankersley (1921-2013) | Hope Baldwin (1919–1993) | Brooks McCormick (1917–2006) | William McCormick Blair Jr. (1916–2015)

Notes:

See Chaim M. Rosenberg, The International Harvester Company: A History of the Founding Families and Their Machines (McFarland, 2019). online
