= William Sanderson McCormick =

American businessman (1815–1865)

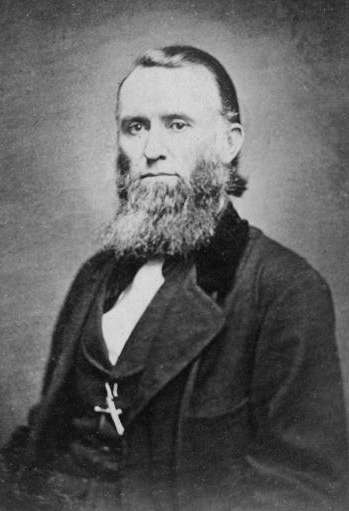
- Born: November 2, 1815; Rockbridge County, Virginia, U.S.
- Died: September 27, 1865 (aged 49); Jacksonville, Illinois, U.S.
- Occupation: Businessman
- Spouse: Mary Ann Grigsby (m. 1848)
- Children: Robert Sanderson McCormick; William Grigsby McCormick; Emma Louise McCormick; Anna Reubenia McCormick; Lucy Virginia McCormick
- Parent(s): Robert McCormick; Mary Ann Hall
- Relatives: See McCormick family

William Sanderson McCormick (November 2, 1815 – September 27, 1865) was an American businessman who developed the McCormick Harvesting Machine Company the company that became the major producer of agricultural equipment in the 19th century. The business became the International Harvester corporation in 1902a. Although he died relatively young with most of the fame going to his brothers, his extended McCormick family continued to be influential in the politics and business of Chicago.

== Life ==
William Sanderson McCormick was born November 2, 1815, on the family estate known as Walnut Grove, in Virginia. His father was Robert McCormick (1780–1846) and mother Mary Ann (Hall) McCormick.

He was educated in public schools and took an interest in business. When the family farm had financial problems in the panic of 1837, he took over its management and made it profitable again. When his father died in 1846, his older brother Cyrus McCormick and younger brother Leander J. McCormick left to start a factory to produce the mechanical reapers that had been developed on the farm, while he was left to take care of the estate.

== Career ==
In 1850, William, his wife, and infant son moved to Chicago to join his brothers in the family business, first on a salary basis. The California Gold Rush had created a labor shortage, which was good for demand, but also caused turnover in the factory employees. William managed the day-to-day operations of the business while Cyrus was often traveling or pursuing patent infringement lawsuits. William tried to mediate between Cyrus (who claimed all the credit as "inventor") and his brother Leander, who was now in charge of technical aspects of product development.

In 1859, he negotiated a formal agreement giving him and Leander one fourth interest in the company, and renamed it "C. H. McCormick & Brothers."

The onset of the American Civil War brought new demand, but stress from another labor shortage. McCormick bought real estate in downtown Chicago which proved to be a wise investment. The family was attacked in the press as being southern sympathizers. In fact, the family never adjusted to the brutal cold of winters in Chicago. Brother Cyrus worsened the conflict by funding conservative newspapers to battle the liberal major publishers that were tied to local politicians. Cyrus traveled to Europe in 1864 where he successfully promoted international sales.

== Personal life ==
He married Mary Ann Grigsby (1828–1878) on July 11, 1848, daughter of Virginia planter Reuben Grigsby of Hickory Hill plantation. Together, William and Mary were the parents of five children:

- Robert Sanderson McCormick (1849–1919), who married Katherine Medill. He served as U.S. Ambassador to Austria-Hungary, Russia and France.
- William Grigsby McCormick (1851–1941), who married Eleanor Brooks on October 23, 1873, and had seven children. He was one of the five founders of the Kappa Sigma fraternity at the University of Virginia in 1869.
- Emma Louise McCormick (1854–1893), who married Wisconsin and Chicago judge, politician and railroad executive Perry H. Smith on June 18, 1878.
- Anna Reubenia "Ruby" McCormick (1860–1917), who married Edward Tyler Blair (1857–1939) on May 29, 1882.
- Lucy Virginia McCormick (1865–1928), who married lawyer Samuel Rountree Jewett (1862–1922), on October 9, 1888.

Outwardly, McCormick was described as "of a cheerful disposition, quick spoken, ... a most interesting and agreeable man". However, he suffered from "nervous dyspepsia" and his mental state deteriorated. Various treatments for his mental illness such as bland diets or water cures proved ineffective. In April 1865 he stated simply to Cyrus "I am extremely nervous". He continued to manage the business until checking into the Illinois State Asylum in Jacksonville, Illinois in August 1865. He died there on September 27, 1865. His widow cashed in her share of the business, moved back to Virginia, and left the children with their uncles in Chicago. He was buried in Graceland Cemetery, and replaced as general manager by Charles A. Spring Jr.

=== Descendants ===
Through his son Robert, he was the paternal grandfather of Joseph Medill McCormick (1877–1925), a U.S. Senator from Illinois, and Robert R. McCormick (1880–1955), the publisher of the Tribune, which had been a major attacker of the family during the war.

Through his son William, he was the paternal grandfather of Chauncey Brooks McCormick (1884–1954), and patrilineal great-grandfather of Brooks McCormick (1917–2006), who was the last McCormick to lead the family firm.

Through his daughter Ruby, he was the maternal grandfather of financier William McCormick Blair (1884–1982) and a great-grandfather of William McCormick Blair Jr. (1916–2015), who served as U.S. Ambassador to Denmark from 1961 to 1964 and as the Philippines from 1964 until 1967.

== Family tree ==
McCormick Chicago family tree

Robert McCormick Jr. (1780–1846)	Mary Ann Hall (1780–1853)
Nancy Fowler (1835–1923)	Cyrus Hall McCormick Sr. (1809–1884)	William Sanderson McCormick (1815–1865)	Mary Ann Grigsby (1828–1878)	Leander James McCormick (1819–1900)
Cyrus Hall McCormick Jr. (1859–1936)	Anita McCormick Blaine (1866–1954)	Harold Fowler McCormick (1872–1941)	Robert Sanderson McCormick (1849–1919)	William Grigsby McCormick (1851–1941)	Anna Reubenia McCormick (1860–1917)	Leander Hamilton McCormick (1859–1934)
Joseph Medill McCormick (1877–1925)	Ruth Hanna (1880–1944)	Robert Rutherford McCormick (1880–1955)	Chauncey Brooks McCormick (1884–1954)	William McCormick Blair Sr. (1884–1982)
Bazy Tankersley (1921-2013)	Hope Baldwin (1919–1993)	Brooks McCormick (1917–2006)	William McCormick Blair Jr. (1916–2015)

Notes:

See Chaim M. Rosenberg, The International Harvester Company: A History of the Founding Families and Their Machines (McFarland, 2019). online
