= William M. Blair =

American investment banker

- Born: May 2, 1884; Chicago, Illinois, US
- Died: March 29, 1982 (aged 97); Chicago, Illinois, US
- Burial place: Lake Forest Cemetery
- Education: Groton School (1903); Yale University (BA, 1907)
- Spouse: Helen Hadduck Bowen
- Children: 4
- Family: McCormick family

William McCormick Blair (May 2, 1884 – March 29, 1982) was an American investment banker and a prominent member of Chicago's business and civic community.

== Early life ==
William McCormick Blair was born May 2, 1884, in Chicago. His father, Edward Tyler Blair, was the son of William Blair, who founded the first wholesale hardware house in Chicago. Edward was a Yale graduate in 1879, who wrote several books including a history of the Chicago Club, and spent his life working in his father's firm. He was very wealthy, and employed four Swedish servants to manage the house while his children were growing up.

William McCormick Blair's mother, Anna Reubenia "Ruby" McCormick (1860–1917), was a daughter of the agricultural machinery manufacturer William Sanderson McCormick (1815–1865) and a member of the illustrious McCormick family. Her grandfather was Robert McCormick Jr. (1780–1846), who invented a mechanical reaper.

=== Education ===
William graduated from Groton School in 1903, and received a BA from Yale University in 1907. At Yale, he was on the rowing crew and a member of the Skull and Bones society. He later received honorary degrees from Northwestern University in 1964 and Lake Forest College.

== Career ==
Upon graduation he entered the Northern Trust Company of Chicago. Shortly after, he entered the bond brokerage firm, David Reid & Company. In 1909 he moved to Lee, Higginson and rose through the ranks, becoming managing partner of its Chicago office.

When it looked as if America would enter World War I in 1917, Blair was involved with the Four-Minute Men of Chicago, giving speeches during film intermissions. He was also active in the sale of War Bonds. When the Four-Minute Men were absorbed by the Committee on Public Information, he went to Washington, D.C., to be its director. Woodrow Wilson sent him a letter of thanks. As the war came to a close he enlisted in the Army and trained in a New York base.

After the war, he continued with Lee, Higginson, but due to the underwriting of Swedish magnate Ivar Kreuger the firm went bankrupt.

In 1934, he was associated with Francis A. Bonner, who was also at Lee, Higginson. Together the two were organising a financial company of their own. Blair was left with no money after the collapse of Lee, Higginson, but he managed to obtain $50,000 from Joseph and Edward Ryerson of the Ryerson company, John and Douglas Stuart of Quaker Oats and Roger Shepherd.

Their firm was opened on January 8, 1935, as Blair, Bonner & Company with an office in the Marshall Field Building at 135 South LaSalle Street in Chicago. The firm specialized in financing homes in the midwestern United States. In its early days, it assisted the growth of the Household Finance Corporation, Continental Casualty and Continental Assurance.

In 1941, Bonner left the company, and it was renamed William Blair & Company. The firm was managed by five partners: William Blair, Wallace Flower, Donald Miehls, Lee Ostrander and Daniel Ritter.

== Personal life ==
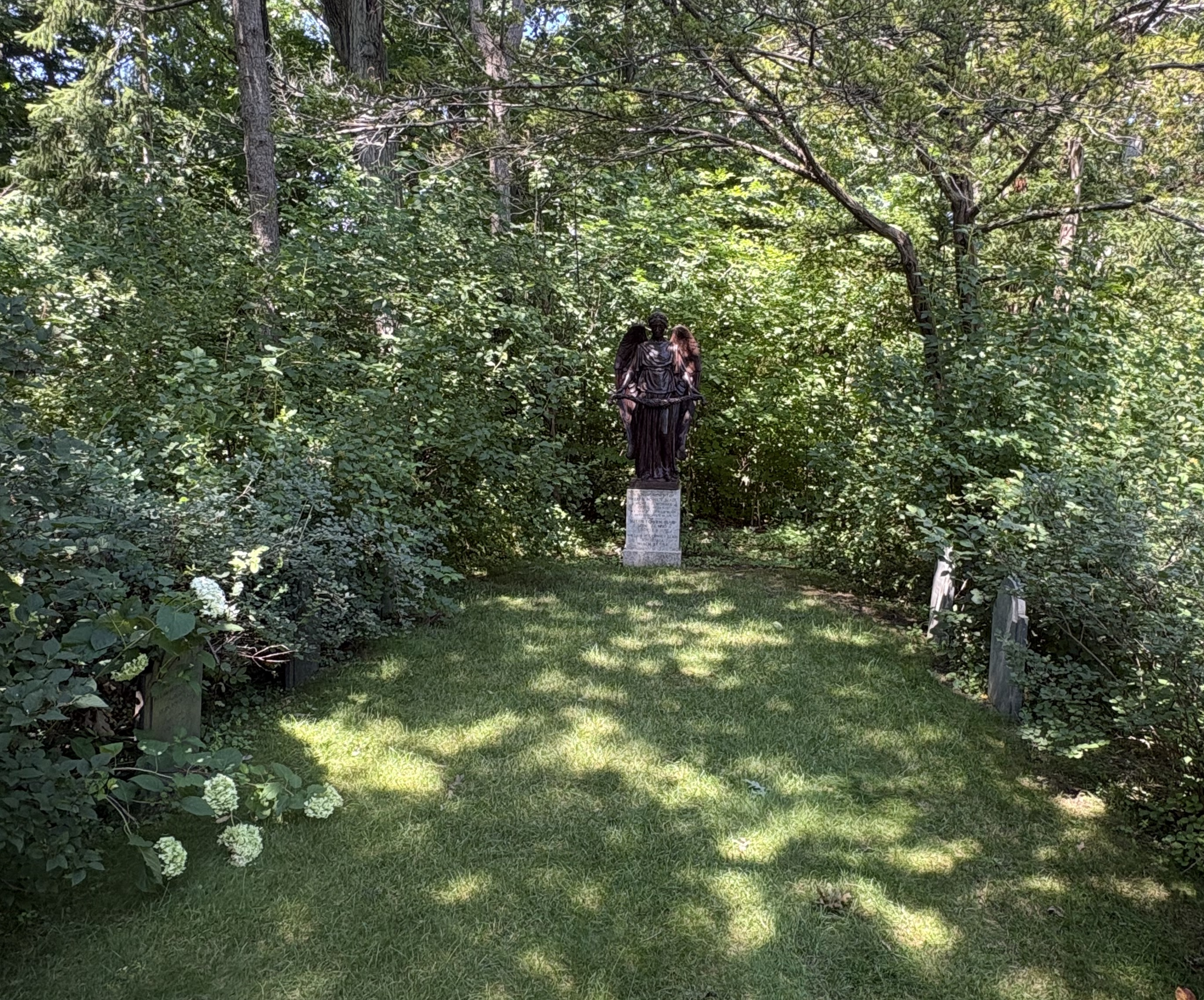
Blair family plot at Lake Forest Cemetery. William M.'s grave is leftmost.

Blair married Helen Hadduck Bowen (1890–1972), daughter of banker Joseph Tilton Bowen and Louise DeKoven Bowen (1859–1953). In 1912 her mother endowed the summer camp for poor children of Hull House known as the Bowen Country Club.

In 1946, Blair's sons, William McCormick Blair Jr., Edward McCormick Blair (born 1915) and Bowen Blair (born 1918) joined the firm. Blair Sr. stepped down as managing partner in 1961, and handed the reins over to son Edward. Bowen Blair died on September 11, 2009. Edward retired in 1977 and died December 22, 2010.

The Blairs also had one daughter, Miss Helen Bowen Blair, who died on July 8, 1930, at the age of 17. She was thrown from her horse at Onwentsia Club in Lake Forest, Illinois and suffered injuries from the runaway horse that caused her death.

Blair was a director of the Continental Casualty Co., the Continental Assurance Co. and the Peoples Gas Light and Coke Co. He was a Life Trustee of the Art Institute of Chicago, a University of Chicago Life Trustee, Trustee of the Field Museum of Natural History, Trustee of Groton School, and Trustee of the Yale Alumni Board. Blair was also on the board of trustees at The Scripps Research Institute.

He remained a senior partner of William Blair & Company until his death. The firm stayed relatively small, and still had offices in the same building on LaSalle street. He died March 29, 1982, at his home in Chicago, and was buried at Lake Forest Cemetery.

- William McCormick Blair Estate
- U.S. National Register of Historic Places
- Location: 982 Sheridan Road, Lake Bluff, Illinois
- Area: 9 acres (3.6 ha)
- Architect: David Adler
- Architectural style: Colonial Revival
- NRHP reference No.: 07001476
- Added to NRHP: January 31, 2008

== Legacy ==
In 1980, Blair guided the founding of the David Adler Music and Arts Center (formerly known as the David Adler Cultural Center) in Libertyville, Illinois. The center is located on the property that once was the home of the architect David Adler, who bequeathed it to the city. Blair had been the client, neighbor, and friend of Adler, and had recruited Adler to become a trustee of the Art Institute of Chicago in 1925.

Adler designed a house for Blair on an 11-acre (4.5 ha) estate they purchased in 1926 when the Crab Tree Farm of Henry Williams Blodgett just north of the village of Lake Bluff, Illinois, was broken up by Scott Sloan Durand (1869–1949). Their garden was designed by Ellen Biddle Shipman. His son Edward also built a house on an adjacent parcel, designed by George Fred Keck. The family bought the rest of Crab Tree Farm in the 1950s. The estate was added to the National Register of Historic Places listings in Lake County, Illinois, on January 31, 2008. It was later owned by John H. Bryan. It is located at 982 Sheridan Road, 42°17′25″N 87°50′4″W.

He was decorated as a chevalier in the Légion d'honneur and as a commander in the Royal Order of Vasa.

The Pritzker Military Museum & Library holds the William McCormick Blair Collection, which consists of letters, news bulletins, pamphlets, publications, newspaper clippings and photographs related to Blair's service as the National Director of the Four Minute Men, a division of the Committee on Public Information during World War I.

=== Family tree ===
McCormick Chicago family tree

Robert McCormick Jr. (1780–1846)	Mary Ann Hall (1780–1853)
Nancy Fowler (1835–1923)	Cyrus Hall McCormick Sr. (1809–1884)	William Sanderson McCormick (1815–1865)	Mary Ann Grigsby (1828–1878)	Leander James McCormick (1819–1900)
Cyrus Hall McCormick Jr. (1859–1936)	Anita McCormick Blaine (1866–1954)	Harold Fowler McCormick (1872–1941)	Robert Sanderson McCormick (1849–1919)	William Grigsby McCormick (1851–1941)	Anna Reubenia McCormick (1860–1917)	Leander Hamilton McCormick (1859–1934)
Joseph Medill McCormick (1877–1925)	Ruth Hanna (1880–1944)	Robert Rutherford McCormick (1880–1955)	Chauncey Brooks McCormick (1884–1954)	William McCormick Blair Sr. (1884–1982)
Bazy Tankersley (1921-2013)	Hope Baldwin (1919–1993)	Brooks McCormick (1917–2006)	William McCormick Blair Jr. (1916–2015)

Notes:

See Chaim M. Rosenberg, The International Harvester Company: A History of the Founding Families and Their Machines (McFarland, 2019). online
