= Brooks McCormick =

American philanthropist and equestrian

- Born: February 23, 1917; Chicago, Illinois, US
- Died: August 15, 2006 (aged 89)
- Occupations: Businessman, Art collector
- Spouse: Hope Baldwin (m. 1940; died 1993)
- Children: 4
- Parent(s): Chauncey McCormick; Marion Deering

Brooks McCormick (February 23, 1917 – August 15, 2006) was an American philanthropist and equestrian from the McCormick family that ran International Harvester. He was the chief executive officer of International Harvester in the 1970s, and was the family's final member to lead the company that they had founded.

== Early life and education ==
Born February 23, 1917, in Chicago, Illinois, to the distinguished McCormick family, McCormick was a great-grandnephew of Cyrus McCormick, whose 19th century development of the horse-drawn reaper was the start of a large agricultural machinery business. His father, Chauncey McCormick (1884–1954), was a cousin of Chicago Tribune publisher Robert R. McCormick, and his mother, Marion Deering, was a daughter of Charles Deering. Charles' father William Deering had founded the Deering Harvester Company, which merged with the McCormicks' harvester business in 1902 to form the basis for International Harvester. Chauncey and Marion Deering wed in 1914.

Brooks McCormick attended the Groton School in Massachusetts. He graduated from Yale University in 1940 with a degree in English.

== Work at International Harvester ==
McCormick joined International Harvester out of Yale, working for the company from 1940 until retiring in 1980. He was groomed for executive positions his entire career, and he became president and chief operating officer in 1968. He was promoted to be chief executive officer from 1971 until January 1978.

During his tenure, McCormick tried to stem financial losses at International Harvester by selling the company's Wisconsin Steel subsidiary and exiting the money-losing pickup truck manufacturing business.

McCormick stepped down as the chairman of International Harvester's executive committee on October 31, 1980, ending almost 150 years of his family's active management in the company. He had no interest in nepotism, and saw little reason to be sad about the passing of the McCormicks' role in the company. "There's no room in this world for emotionalism or sentimentality," he told the Chicago Tribune at the time of his retirement.

== Equestrian activities ==
In the 1920s, McCormick's father Chauncey purchased a massive horse farm in what is now unincorporated Warrenville, Illinois. The property eventually was expanded to more than 600 acres (2.4 km^{2}) and became known as St. James Farm. McCormick took possession of the property after his father's death in September 1954 and significantly expanded it, holding an annual steeplechase event on the property to raise money for charity. McCormick said that his goal behind the steeplechase event was "to revive public interest in a major equestrian sport missing in this area for half a century."

In 2000, McCormick sold the farm for $43 million to the Forest Preserve District of DuPage County, with the stipulation that it would take possession of the farm upon McCormick's death. A condition of a bequest related to the sale was the demolition of several structures on the property, including McCormick's own mansion, which had been designed by noted architect Jarvis Hunt. It is now known as St. James Farm Forest Preserve.

== Philanthropy ==
A noted philanthropist and art collector, McCormick bequeathed 11 works of art to the Art Institute of Chicago upon his death in 2006, including paintings by Édouard Manet, Edgar Degas, Winslow Homer, Paul Cézanne, and John Singer Sargent. McCormick had been president of the Art Institute's board from 1944 until 1954. McCormick also willed his collection of rare bird books and paintings to the International Crane Foundation, which reaped more than $2.7 million from their sale after his death.

== Family ==
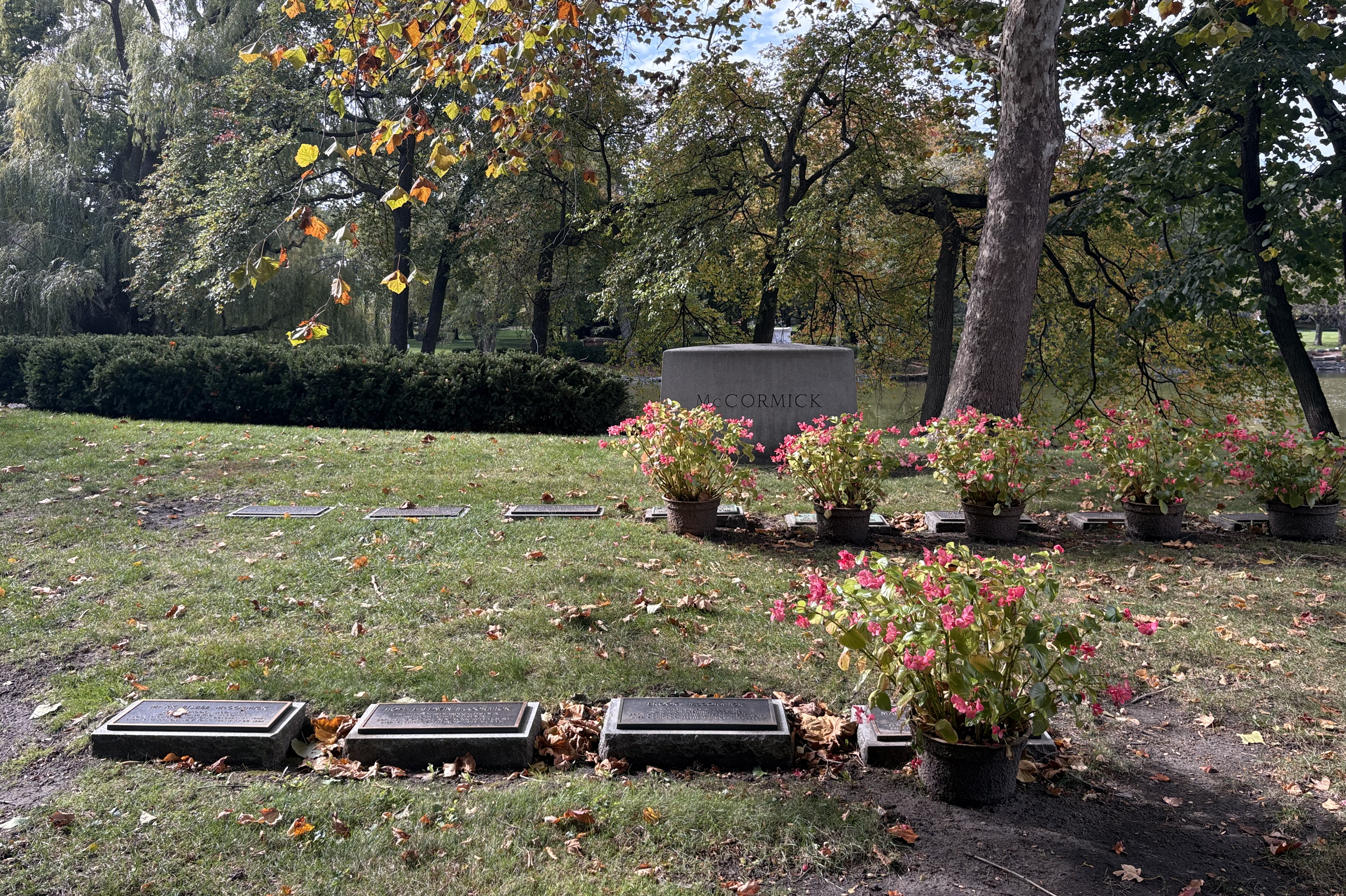
McCormick's grave (front row, third from left) at Graceland Cemetery

McCormick's wife, former Illinois state legislator Hope Baldwin McCormick, died in 1993. McCormick had four children, two of whom died before him. His eldest daughter, Martha McCormick Hunt, died in 1989 of cervical cancer at age 46, and his son Mark died in 1992 at age 47 of carbon monoxide poisoning in a suicide that was caused by depression. McCormick's other two children are his daughter, Abby McCormick O'Neil (born circa 1951), and a son, Brooks McCormick Jr. (born March 1944).

McCormick was described by the Tribune's Michael Kilian in 1990 as an "intensely private person who reflexively shuns public attention."

McCormick died on August 15, 2006, and was buried at Graceland Cemetery.

=== Family tree ===
McCormick Chicago family tree

Robert McCormick Jr. (1780–1846) | Mary Ann Hall (1780–1853)
Nancy Fowler (1835–1923) | Cyrus Hall McCormick Sr. (1809–1884) | William Sanderson McCormick (1815–1865) | Mary Ann Grigsby (1828–1878) | Leander James McCormick (1819–1900)
Cyrus Hall McCormick Jr. (1859–1936) | Anita McCormick Blaine (1866–1954) | Harold Fowler McCormick (1872–1941) | Robert Sanderson McCormick (1849–1919) | William Grigsby McCormick (1851–1941) | Anna Reubenia McCormick (1860–1917) | Leander Hamilton McCormick (1859–1934)
Joseph Medill McCormick (1877–1925) | Ruth Hanna (1880–1944) | Robert Rutherford McCormick (1880–1955) | Chauncey Brooks McCormick (1884–1954) | William McCormick Blair Sr. (1884–1982)
Bazy Tankersley (1921-2013) | Hope Baldwin (1919–1993) | Brooks McCormick (1917–2006) | William McCormick Blair Jr. (1916–2015)

Notes:

See Chaim M. Rosenberg, The International Harvester Company: A History of the Founding Families and Their Machines (McFarland, 2019). online
