= Hickory Hill (Glasgow, Virginia) =

Historic house in Virginia, United States

- U.S. National Register of Historic Places
- Virginia Landmarks Register
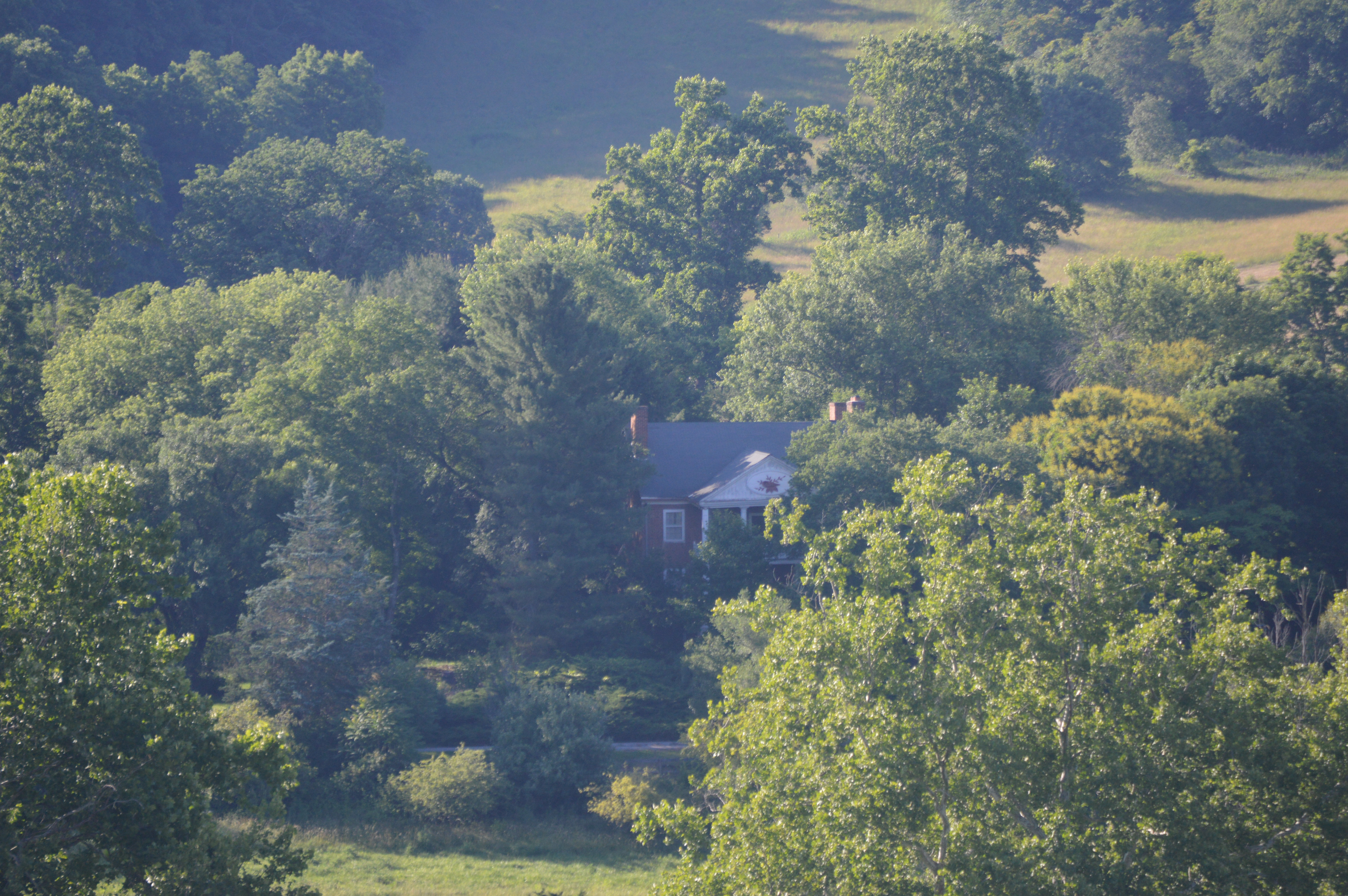
- Distant view from the south

- Location within Virginia Location within the United States
- Location: 197 Hickory Hill Lane, Glasgow, Virginia
- Coordinates: 37°39′54″N 79°28′39″W
- Area: 123 acres (50 ha)
- Built: 1824; 202 years ago
- Architectural style: Federal
- NRHP reference No.: 06000760
- VLR No.: 081-0022

Significant dates
- Added to NRHP: August 30, 2006
- Designated VLR: June 8, 2006

Hickory Hill is a historic estate in Rockbridge County, Virginia.

The main house at Hickory Hill was built from 1823 to 1824 for Reuben Grigsby who was born June 6, 1780. He was one of many children, cousin to educator Hugh Blair Grigsby (1806–1881). Daughter Mary Ann Grigsby (1828–1878) married William Sanderson McCormick (1815–1865) on July 11, 1848. McCormick was son of Robert McCormick (1780–1846) of the plantation called Walnut Grove which was located on the northern end of the same county. After giving birth to Robert Sanderson McCormick (1849–1919), the family moved to Chicago to go into business with brothers Cyrus McCormick and Leander J. McCormick.

Reuben Grigsby died on the estate on February 6, 1863. Son Lucien Porter Grigsby (1820–1893), was the last Grigsby to own the farm. The estate was broken up in 1874 with some going to various daughters. In 1878 the house was sold to settle Lucien's debts, and passed through a number of owners. On June 10, 1929, it was purchased by Robert Rutherford "Colonel" McCormick (1880–1955), and Chauncey McCormick (1884–1954), cousins who were great-grandsons of Reuben Grigsby.

The main house is constructed in the Federal architecture style from Flemish bond brick with three integrated chimneys. The south side has a two-story portico with Doric columns.

Hickory Hill was owned by the McCormick family until 1944.

It was added to the Virginia state list of historic places as site 081–0022 on June 8, 2006, and the National Register of Historic Places on August 30, 2006. At the time its owners were Donald J. Hasfurther and his wife Cameron F. Bushnell, and about 123 acres (50 ha) remained preserved.

It is located at 197 Hickory Hill Lane between State Route 608 (Forge Road) and Interstate 81, north of the current town of Glasgow, Virginia.
