= William McCormick Blair Jr. =

American diplomat (1916–2015)

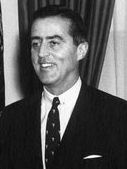
- Blair in 1961

10th United States Ambassador to the Philippines
- In office 1964–1967
- President: Lyndon B. Johnson
- Preceded by: William Stevenson
- Succeeded by: G. Mennen Williams

46th United States Ambassador to Denmark
- In office 1961–1964
- President: John F. Kennedy; Lyndon B. Johnson
- Preceded by: Val Peterson
- Succeeded by: Katharine White

Personal details
- Born: October 24, 1916 Chicago, Illinois, U.S.
- Died: August 29, 2015 (aged 98) Manhattan, New York, U.S.
- Resting place: Lake Forest Cemetery
- Party: Democratic
- Spouse: Catherine Gerlach
- Children: William McCormick Blair III
- Parent(s): William M. Blair; Helen Hadduck Bowen
- Education: Stanford University (B.A.); University of Virginia (J.D.)

William McCormick "Bill" Blair Jr. (October 24, 1916 – August 29, 2015) was an American diplomat who served as United States Ambassador to Denmark from 1961 to 1964 and as United States Ambassador to the Philippines from 1964 until 1967. A lawyer, he also was a close associate of Adlai Stevenson II. He was awarded an honorary Doctor of Laws (L.L. D.) degree from Whittier College in 1964.

== Early life ==
Blair was a son of Helen Hadduck (Bowen) and William M. Blair, who co-founded the investment banking firm William Blair & Company. He graduated from the Groton School in 1935, Stanford University, and the University of Virginia Law School in 1947.

== Personal life ==
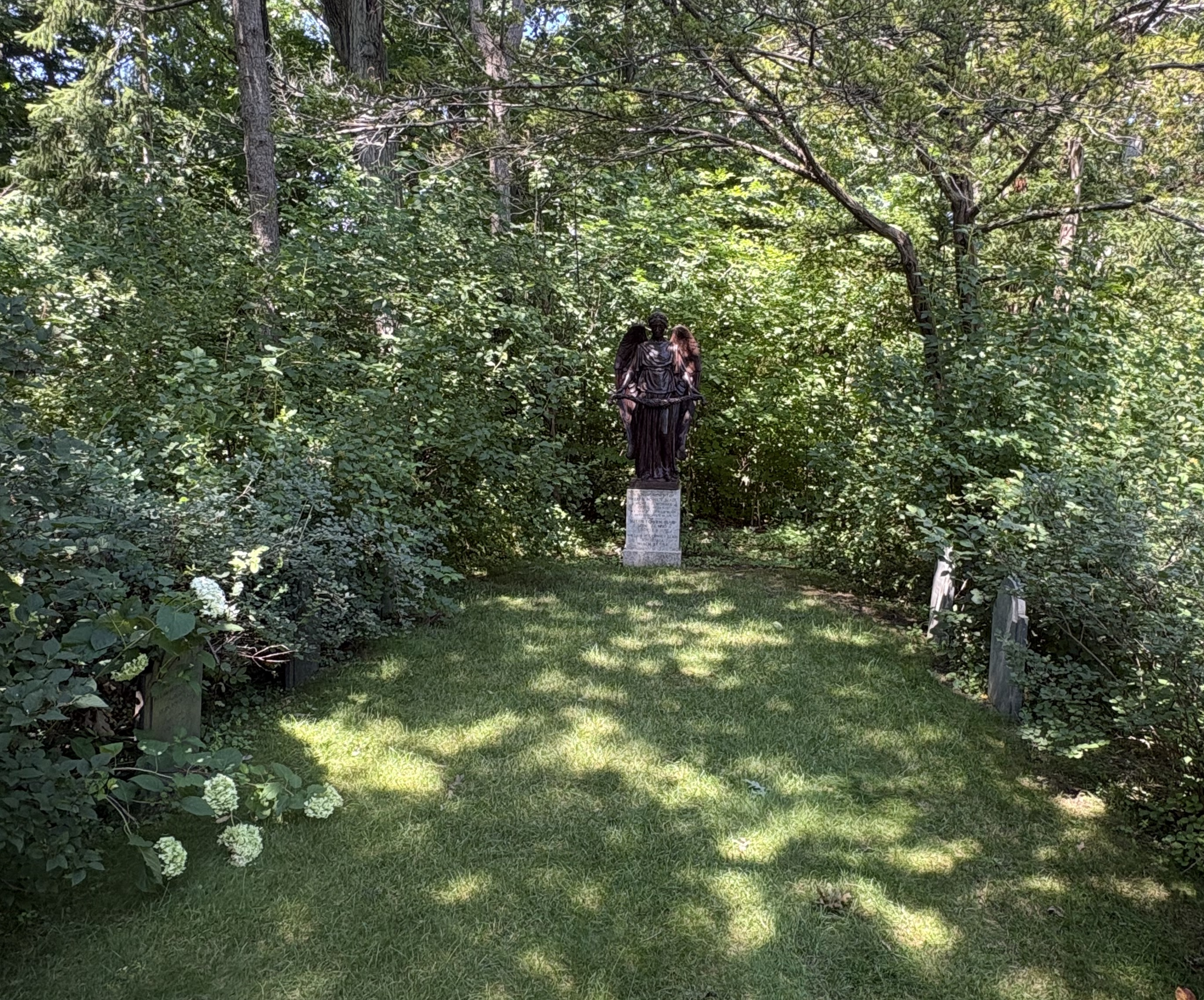
Blair family plot at Lake Forest Cemetery. William McCormick Jr.'s grave is rightmost.

On September 9, 1961, in the chapel at Frederiksborg Castle in Hillerød, Denmark, Ambassador Blair married Catherine "Deeda" Gerlach (born 1931), the former wife of oleomargarine heir Charles Clarke Jelke and the only daughter of Norman Harbridge Gerlach (1904–1980), a partner in the Chicago law firm Gerlach & O'Brien, and his wife, the former Joanna Powell. Deeda Blair (who was later a subject of portraits by Andy Warhol) was named director and vice-president of the Lasker Foundation in 1965 and is a noted advocate for public health issues.

The couple had one child, a son named William McCormick Blair III, who committed suicide in May 2004 at age 41. After their son's death, they relocated from Washington, D.C., to New York City. He died on August 29, 2015, at his home in Manhattan at the age of 98, and was buried at Lake Forest Cemetery in Illinois.

== Family tree ==
McCormick Chicago family tree

Robert McCormick Jr. (1780–1846)	Mary Ann Hall (1780–1853)
Nancy Fowler (1835–1923)	Cyrus Hall McCormick Sr. (1809–1884)	William Sanderson McCormick (1815–1865)	Mary Ann Grigsby (1828–1878)	Leander James McCormick (1819–1900)
Cyrus Hall McCormick Jr. (1859–1936)	Anita McCormick Blaine (1866–1954)	Harold Fowler McCormick (1872–1941)	Robert Sanderson McCormick (1849–1919)	William Grigsby McCormick (1851–1941)	Anna Reubenia McCormick (1860–1917)	Leander Hamilton McCormick (1859–1934)
Joseph Medill McCormick (1877–1925)	Ruth Hanna (1880–1944)	Robert Rutherford McCormick (1880–1955)	Chauncey Brooks McCormick (1884–1954)	William McCormick Blair Sr. (1884–1982)
Bazy Tankersley (1921-2013)	Hope Baldwin (1919–1993)	Brooks McCormick (1917–2006)	William McCormick Blair Jr. (1916–2015)

Notes:

See Chaim M. Rosenberg, The International Harvester Company: A History of the Founding Families and Their Machines (McFarland, 2019). online

Diplomatic posts
Preceded by Val Peterson	U.S. Ambassador to Denmark; 1961–1964	Succeeded by Katharine Elkus White
Preceded by William E. Stevenson	U.S. Ambassador to the Philippines; 1964–1967	Succeeded by G. Mennen Williams
