= Leander J. McCormick =

American inventor and philanthropist (1819–1900)

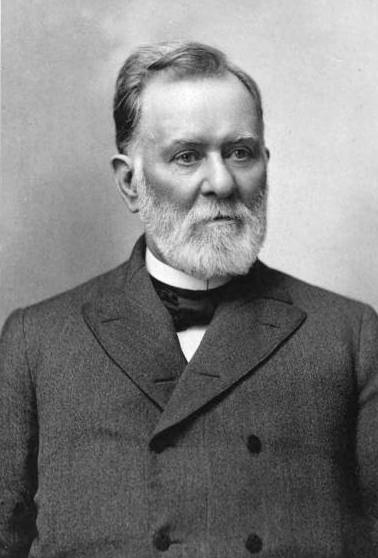
- Born: Leander James McCormick; February 8, 1819; Rockbridge County, Virginia, U.S.
- Died: February 20, 1900 (aged 81); Chicago, Illinois, U.S.
- Occupations: Inventor, businessman and philanthropist
- Spouse: Henrietta Maria Hamilton (m. 1845; died 1899)
- Children: Robert Hall McCormick II; Elizabeth Maria McCormick; Henrietta Laura McCormick; Leander Hamilton McCormick
- Parent(s): Robert McCormick, Jr. Mary Ann Hall

Leander James McCormick (February 8, 1819 – February 20, 1900) was an American inventor, manufacturer, philanthropist, and businessman and a member of the McCormick family of Chicago and Virginia. Along with his elder brothers Cyrus and William, he is regarded as one of the fathers of modern agriculture due to his part in the development of the McCormick Reaper and what became the International Harvester Company. He also owned and developed vast amounts of real estate in downtown Chicago and Lake Forest, Illinois. In 1885, he donated one of the world's largest telescopes to the University of Virginia.

== Early life ==
McCormick was born on February 8, 1819, in Rockbridge County, Virginia. He was the fourth of five sons born to Robert McCormick, Jr. (1780–1846) and Mary Ann "Polly" Hall (1780–1853) of the prominent McCormick family. His older brothers were Cyrus McCormick and William Sanderson McCormick. Another older brother, Robert Hall McCormick, died as a teenager, and his younger brother, John Prestly McCormick, died as a young adult.

He was raised at the family homestead known as Walnut Grove, near Raphine in Rockbridge County, in the Shenandoah Valley on the western side of the Blue Ridge Mountains.

== Career ==
His father invented agricultural machines including the mechanical reaper. His eldest brother Cyrus received the patent in 1834 and Leander developed multiple improvements to the reaper and received patents for two of them, with the remainder being patented by his brother Cyrus. Following the death of their father, Leander owned a third share of the reaper business, which amounted to 75 machines in 1846.

In 1847, Leander helped Cyrus set up a factory in Cincinnati, Ohio that produced 100 machines. In fall 1848, he moved to Chicago with his wife and infant son to join Cyrus in setting up an even larger factory. Brother William joined them in 1850 in a business in run by Cyrus to manufacture reapers and sell them across the midwestern United States. They created what eventually became known as the McCormick Harvesting Machine Company, with Leander taking over management of the manufacturing department, which he controlled for the next 30 years. By 1870, the McCormicks were one of the wealthiest families in the United States.

In 1871, the Great Chicago Fire destroyed much of the Reaper Works and other buildings, as well as the Leander McCormick family residence at the corner of Rush Street and Ohio Street, 41°53′32″N 87°37′31″W. Leander, his wife and children fled their burning home in the early morning hours. They moved to the west side of the city for the next several years. The McCormicks, under Leander's direction, quickly rebuilt and recovered. By 1879, the business had fully recovered and was merged into a corporation. Leander stayed active in the management of the business until his retirement in 1889.

=== Later life ===
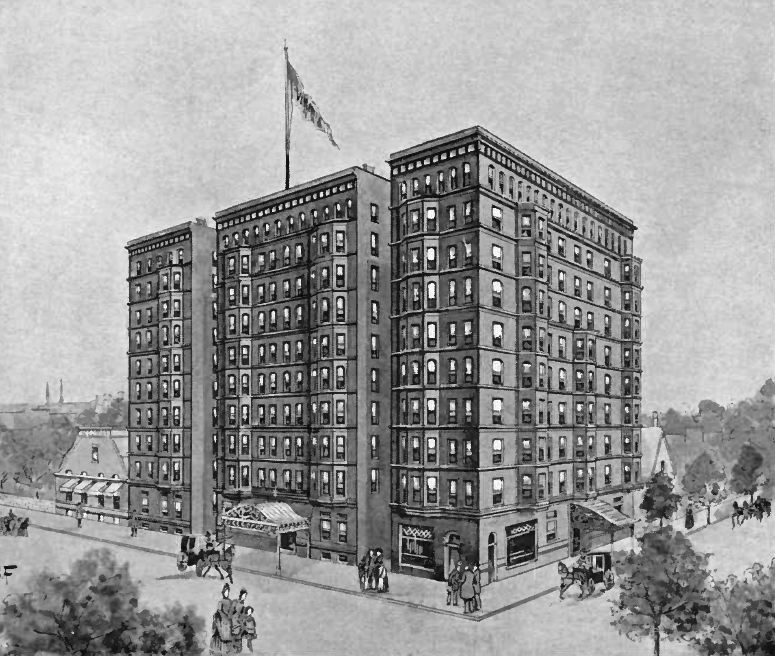
Sketch of Virginia Hotel from 1893 brochure

After retiring from the business, McCormick then invested heavily in real estate. In his later years, McCormick remained in Chicago and began to research the McCormick genealogy. He eventually produced and published a book on the McCormick family. In 1889 he funded construction of the Virginia Hotel at Rush and Ohio, where McCormick spent the rest of his life. The 400-room hotel was advertised as "an absolutely fire-proof building and a finished hotel second to no other." The hotel featured ornate granite interiors decorated with marble statues, separate "gentlemen's smoking room" and "ladies dining room", and a room of boilers and dynamos to offer the latest technology: electric lights. It was ready in time for the 1893 World's Columbian Exposition. At the time of his death in 1900, he had extensive holdings in downtown Chicago, and a stock farm in Lake Forest, Illinois.

McCormick donated funds for a refracting telescope to the University of Virginia. The telescope and building are known as McCormick Observatory and opened in 1885; the telescope was the largest in the U.S. and second largest in the world when completed.

== Personal life ==
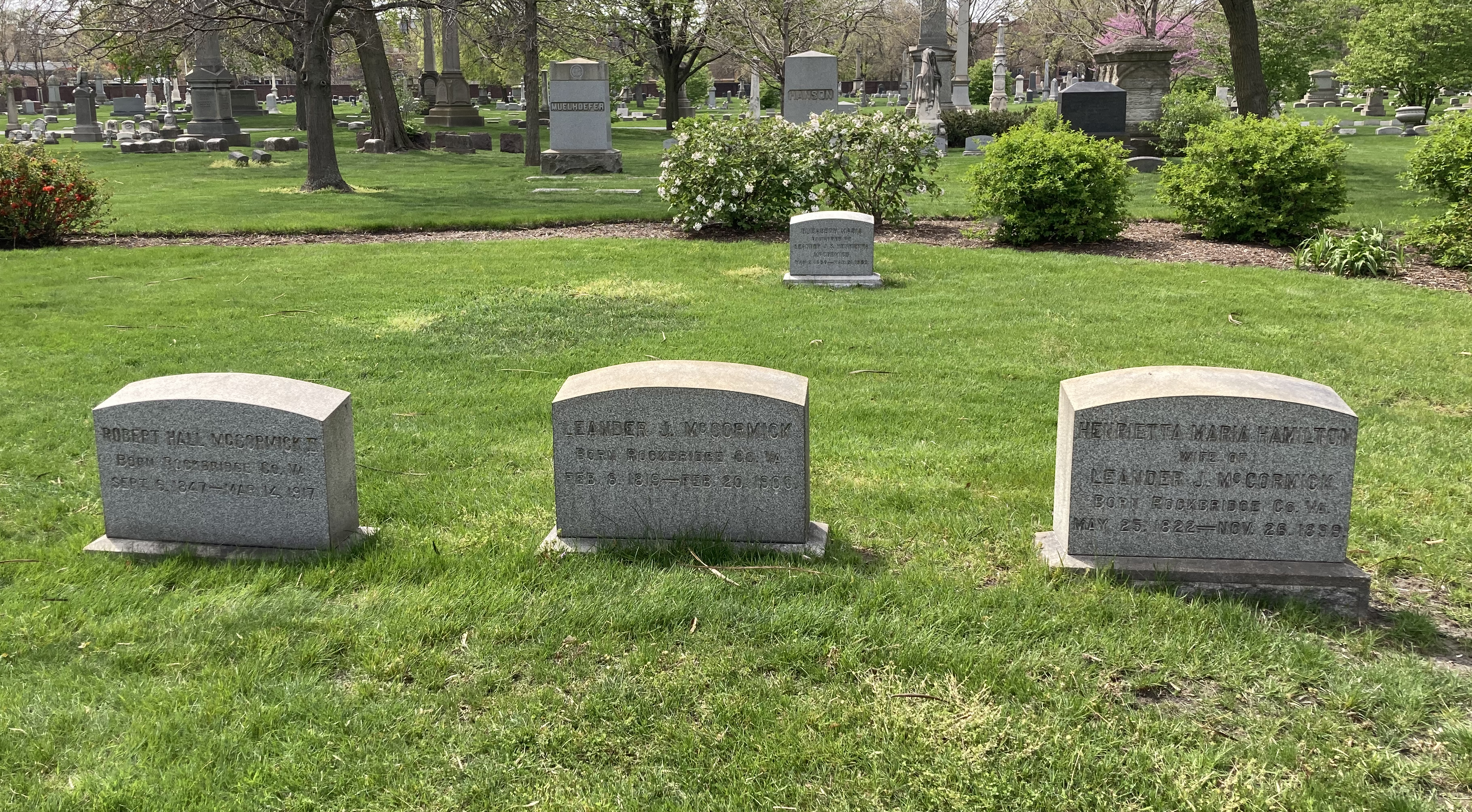
McCormick's grave at Graceland Cemetery

On October 22, 1845, at age 26, McCormick married Henrietta Maria Hamilton at her parents' homestead, Locust Hill, in Rockbridge County. Henrietta was the daughter of John Hamilton (1789–1825) and Elizabeth McNutt Hamilton (1794-1871) whose brother was Mississippi Governor Alexander Gallatin McNutt. Together, Henrietta and Leander were the parents of four children:

- Robert Hall McCormick II (1847–1917), who married Sarah Lord Day on June 1, 1871.
- Elizabeth Maria McCormick (1850–1853), who died young.
- Henrietta Laura McCormick (1857–1932), who married British barrister Frederick E. McCormick-Goodhart (1854–1924) on November 14, 1883, established a 540-acre (2.2 km^{2}) estate northeast of Washington D.C. known as Langley Park. She published a memoir titled Hands across the sea.
- Leander Hamilton McCormick (1859–1934), who married Constance Plummer on February 14, 1887.

His wife died in November 1899, and he died on February 20, 1900, at the Virginia Hotel. He was buried at Graceland Cemetery. His eldest son became executor of the estate.

=== Family tree ===
McCormick Chicago family tree

Robert McCormick Jr. (1780–1846)	Mary Ann Hall (1780–1853)
Nancy Fowler (1835–1923)	Cyrus Hall McCormick Sr. (1809–1884)	William Sanderson McCormick (1815–1865)	Mary Ann Grigsby (1828–1878)	Leander James McCormick (1819–1900)
Cyrus Hall McCormick Jr. (1859–1936)	Anita McCormick Blaine (1866–1954)	Harold Fowler McCormick (1872–1941)	Robert Sanderson McCormick (1849–1919)	William Grigsby McCormick (1851–1941)	Anna Reubenia McCormick (1860–1917)	Leander Hamilton McCormick (1859–1934)
Joseph Medill McCormick (1877–1925)	Ruth Hanna (1880–1944)	Robert Rutherford McCormick (1880–1955)	Chauncey Brooks McCormick (1884–1954)	William McCormick Blair Sr. (1884–1982)
Bazy Tankersley (1921-2013)	Hope Baldwin (1919–1993)	Brooks McCormick (1917–2006)	William McCormick Blair Jr. (1916–2015)

Notes:

See Chaim M. Rosenberg, The International Harvester Company: A History of the Founding Families and Their Machines (McFarland, 2019). online
