= Robert Sanderson McCormick =

American diplomat (1849–1919)

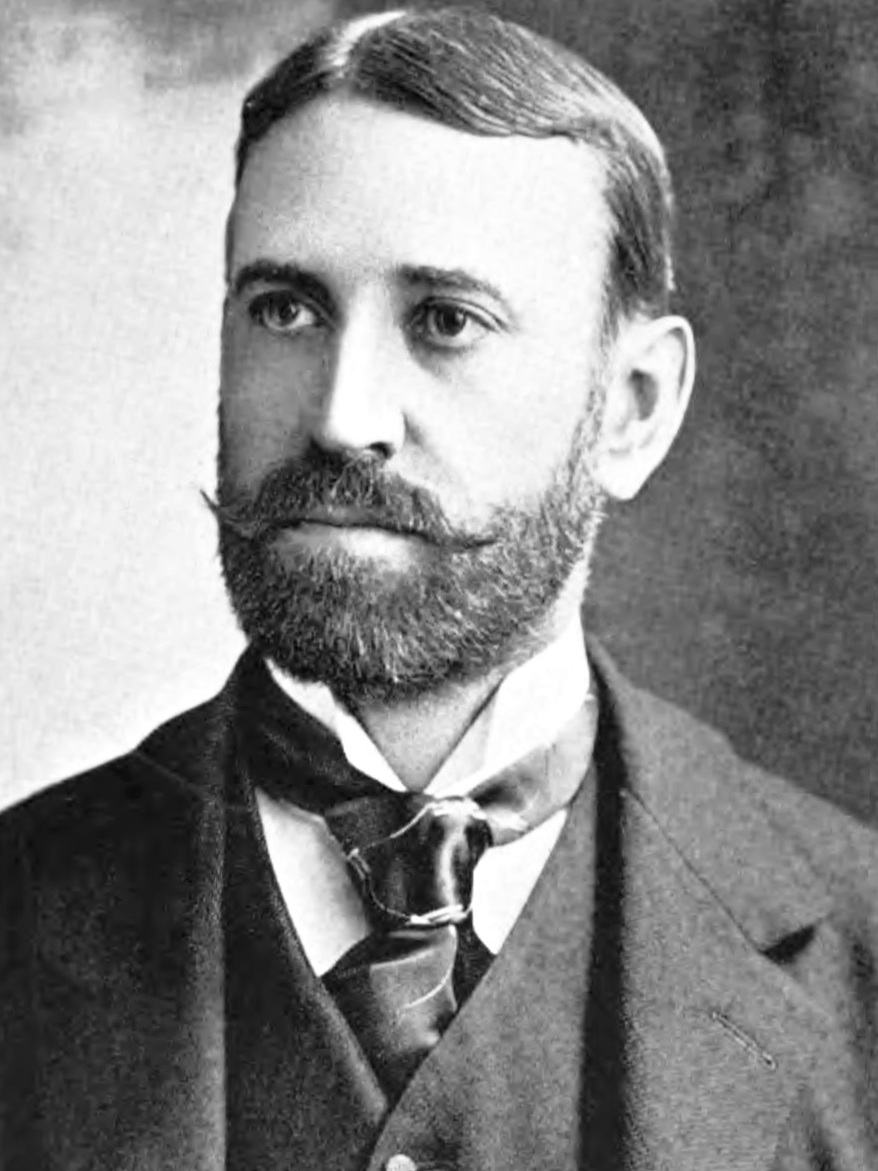
- Photograph of McCormick, c. 1896

United States Ambassador to France
- In office May 2, 1905 – March 2, 1907
- President: Theodore Roosevelt
- Preceded by: Horace Porter
- Succeeded by: Henry White

United States Ambassador to Russia
- In office January 12, 1903 – March 27, 1905
- President: Theodore Roosevelt
- Preceded by: Charlemagne Tower, Jr.
- Succeeded by: George von Lengerke Meyer

19th United States Ambassador to Austria-Hungary
- In office March 7, 1901 – December 29, 1902
- President: Theodore Roosevelt
- Preceded by: Addison C. Harris
- Succeeded by: Bellamy Storer

Personal details
- Born: July 26, 1849 Rockbridge County, Virginia, U.S.
- Died: April 16, 1919 (aged 69) Hinsdale, Illinois, U.S.
- Spouse: Katherine Medill (m. 1876)
- Children: Joseph M. McCormick; Katrina McCormick; Robert R. McCormick
- Parent(s): William Sanderson McCormick; Mary Ann Grigsby
- Relatives: See McCormick family
- Education: University of Chicago
- Alma mater: University of Virginia
- Occupation: Diplomat

Robert Sanderson McCormick (July 26, 1849 – April 16, 1919) was an American diplomat. Born in rural Virginia, he was part of the extended McCormick family that became influential in Chicago.

== Early life ==
McCormick was born July 26, 1849, on the family plantation known as Walnut Grove in Rockbridge County, Virginia. His father was William Sanderson McCormick (1815–1865) and his mother was Mary Ann (née Grigsby) McCormick (1828–1878), whose family owned the Hickory Hill plantation.

When Robert was an infant, his family moved to Chicago to join the McCormick family agricultural machinery business, which in 1902 merged into International Harvester. He attended prep school at the University of Chicago and went to college at the University of Virginia.

== Career ==
McCormick formed a partnership with his paternal cousin Hugh Leander Adams, which they named McCormick & Adams, to invest in a grain elevator at St. Louis, Missouri, in 1876. In the continuing national economic troubles in the aftermath of the panic of 1873, the enterprise failed.

=== Diplomatic career ===
Politically active and a major donor to the Republican Party, in 1889 McCormick was appointed as Second Secretary of the American Legation in London, where he served from 1889 to 1892, under Minister Robert Todd Lincoln, eldest son of the late President Abraham Lincoln. That led to his appointment as official representative for the Chicago World's Columbian Exposition in 1893.

His diplomatic career took off when President William McKinley appointed him as U.S. Minister to Austria-Hungary on March 7, 1901. McCormick presented his credentials on April 29, 1901, and served through McKinley's assassination at the Pan-American Exposition on September 14, 1901. McCormick continued in the role during Theodore Roosevelt's term and when the relationship between the two countries was upgraded, he was promoted, becoming the first American ambassador to Austria-Hungary on May 27, 1902, and served in that role until December 29, 1902.

On September 26, 1902, Roosevelt appointed him to St. Petersburg to serve as United States Ambassador to Imperial Russia. He was commissioned during a recess of the Senate and recommissioned on December 8, 1902, after confirmation. McCormick presented his credentials on January 12, 1903, and was present in St Petersburg during the Bloody Sunday protests of that year. After reaching appointment as U.S. Ambassador to France on March 8, 1905, he presented his recall on March 27, 1905.

He presented his credentials in Paris on May 2, 1905, and replaced Horace Porter. McCormick served for almost two years, retiring from the diplomatic services in 1907 when his health started to decline. He presented his recall on March 2, 1907, and was replaced by Henry White, who had been the Ambassador to Italy.

== Personal life ==
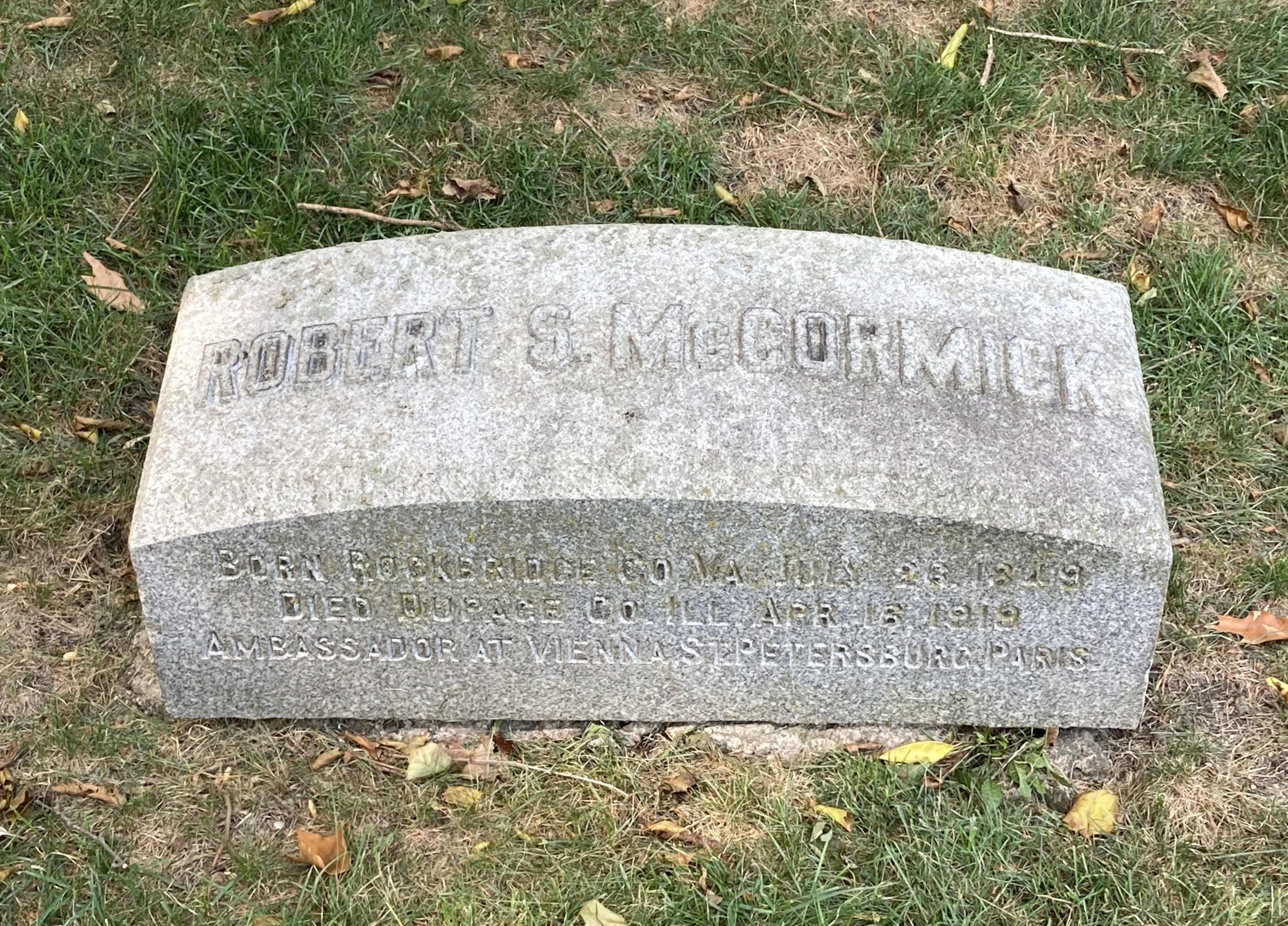
McCormick's grave at Graceland Cemetery

On June 8, 1876, he married Katherine van Etta "Kate" Medill (1853–1932). She was a daughter of Joseph Medill (1823–1899), who owned and managed the Chicago Tribune newspaper, and his wife. Together, the McCormicks were the parents of three children:

- Joseph Medill McCormick (1877–1925), who was elected as a U.S. Senator from Illinois. He married Ruth Hanna, daughter of US Senator Mark Hanna (D-OH).
- Katrina McCormick (1879–1879), who died in infancy.
- Robert Rutherford McCormick (1880–1955), who became the influential editor of the Chicago Tribune.

McCormick died from pneumonia on April 16, 1919, at his home in Hinsdale, Illinois. He was buried in Graceland Cemetery.

== Awards ==
- In 1907, Emperor Nicholas II of Russia conferred on him the Order of St. Alexander Nevsky, in recognition of his services to Russia during the war with Japan.
- The Japanese decorated him with the first class of the Order of the Rising Sun, for his attention to Japan's interest during the Russo-Japanese War. He was credited with negotiating with Russia to allow Jews to emigrate using US passports, as suggested by Chicago Rabbi Emil G. Hirsch.
- The French government conferred on him the Grand Cordon of the Legion of Honor, for furthering the relations between France and the United States.

== Family tree ==
McCormick Chicago family tree

Robert McCormick Jr. (1780–1846)	Mary Ann Hall (1780–1853)
Nancy Fowler (1835–1923)	Cyrus Hall McCormick Sr. (1809–1884)	William Sanderson McCormick (1815–1865)	Mary Ann Grigsby (1828–1878)	Leander James McCormick (1819–1900)
Cyrus Hall McCormick Jr. (1859–1936)	Anita McCormick Blaine (1866–1954)	Harold Fowler McCormick (1872–1941)	Robert Sanderson McCormick (1849–1919)	William Grigsby McCormick (1851–1941)	Anna Reubenia McCormick (1860–1917)	Leander Hamilton McCormick (1859–1934)
Joseph Medill McCormick (1877–1925)	Ruth Hanna (1880–1944)	Robert Rutherford McCormick (1880–1955)	Chauncey Brooks McCormick (1884–1954)	William McCormick Blair Sr. (1884–1982)
Bazy Tankersley (1921-2013)	Hope Baldwin (1919–1993)	Brooks McCormick (1917–2006)	William McCormick Blair Jr. (1916–2015)

Notes:

See Chaim M. Rosenberg, The International Harvester Company: A History of the Founding Families and Their Machines (McFarland, 2019). online

Preceded by A. C. Harris	United States Ambassador to Austria; 1901-1902	Succeeded by Bellamy Storer
Preceded by Charlemagne Tower, Jr.	United States Ambassador to Russia; 1902–1905	Succeeded by George v. L. Meyer
Preceded by Horace Porter	United States Ambassador to France; 1905–1907	Succeeded by Henry White
