= McCormick family =

Prominent American family

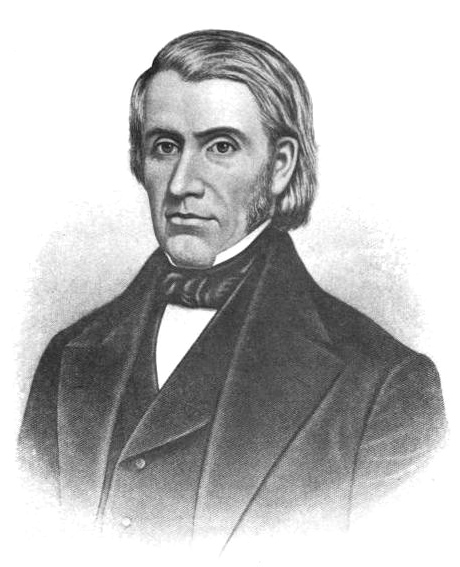
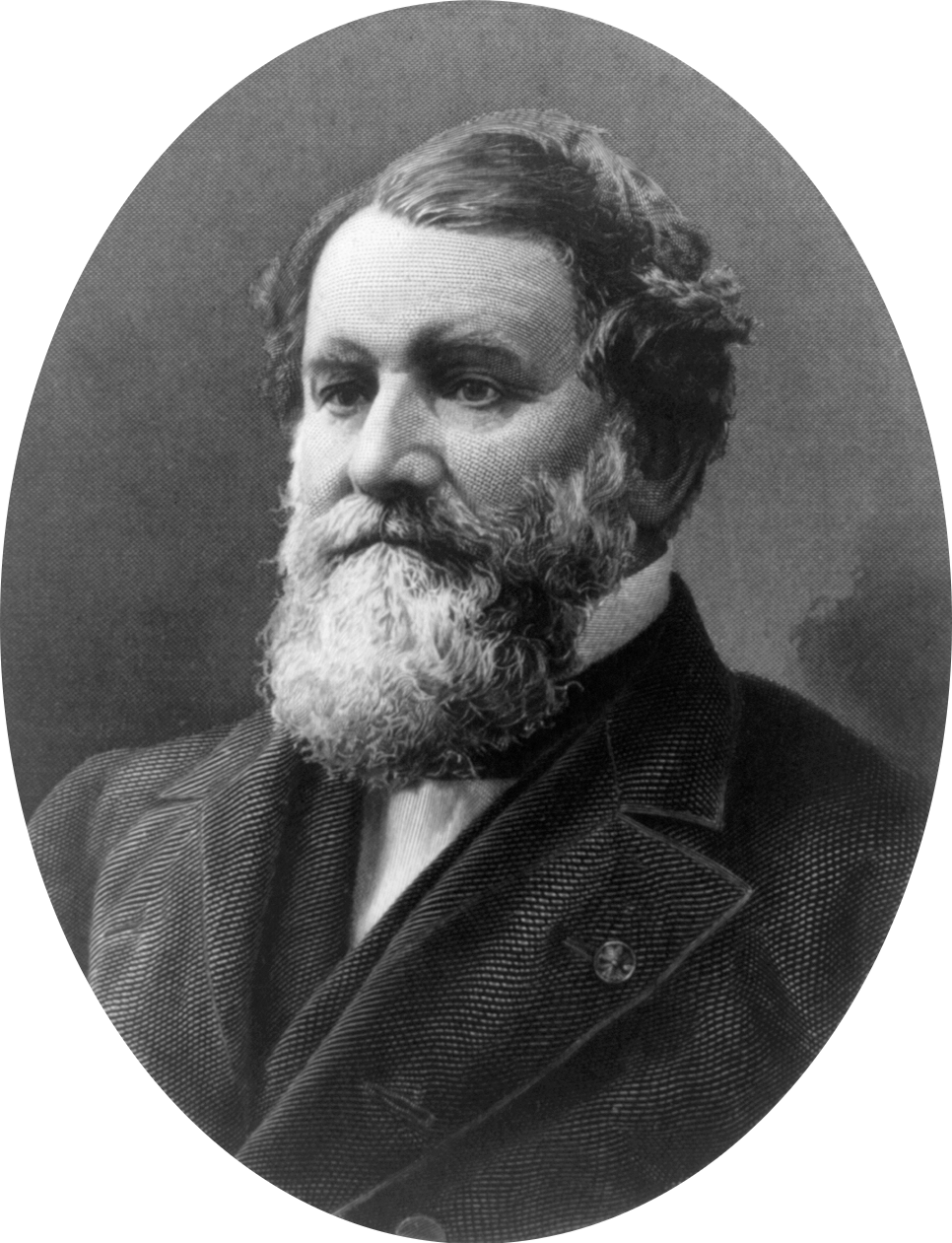
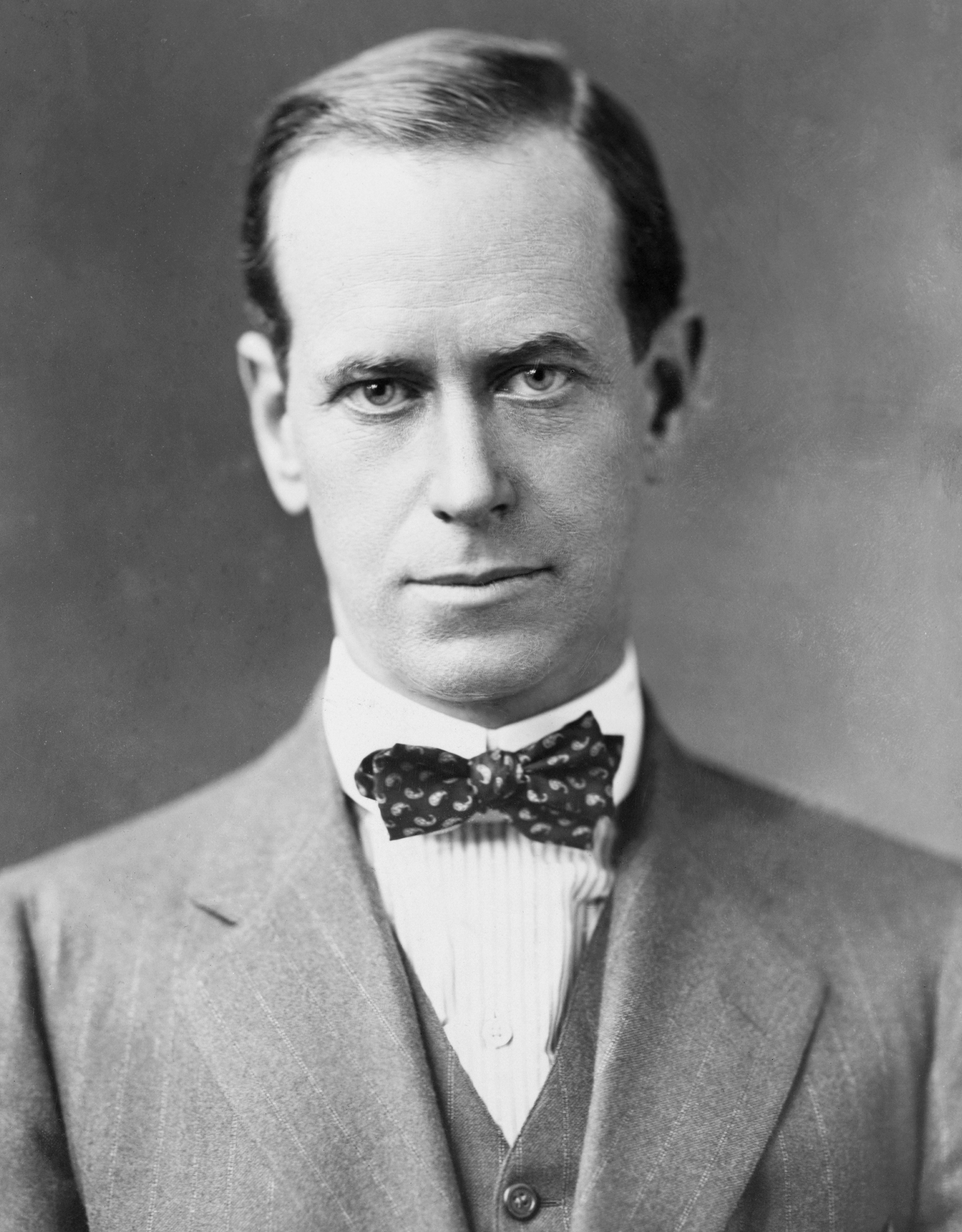
- Robert McCormick Jr. Cyrus Hall McCormick Joseph Medill McCormick
- Current region: Chicago, Illinois; Virginia
- Origin: County Londonderry, Ireland
- Founded: 1700s
- Founder: Thomas McCormick
- Connected families: Rockefeller family

The McCormick family of Chicago and Virginia is an American family of Scottish and Scots-Irish descent that attained prominence and fortune starting with the invention of the McCormick reaper, a machine that revolutionized agriculture by initiating the mechanization of harvesting grain. Through the McCormick Harvesting Machine Company and later, the International Harvester Company and other investments, the McCormicks became one of the wealthiest families in America. The name became ubiquitous in agriculture starting in the 19th century and the press dubbed the McCormicks the "Reaper Kings". Later generations expanded into media and publishing (Tribune Company), finance (William Blair & Company), and real estate (McCormick Estates). Various family members were well known as civic leaders. The family was originally Presbyterian.

== Family members ==
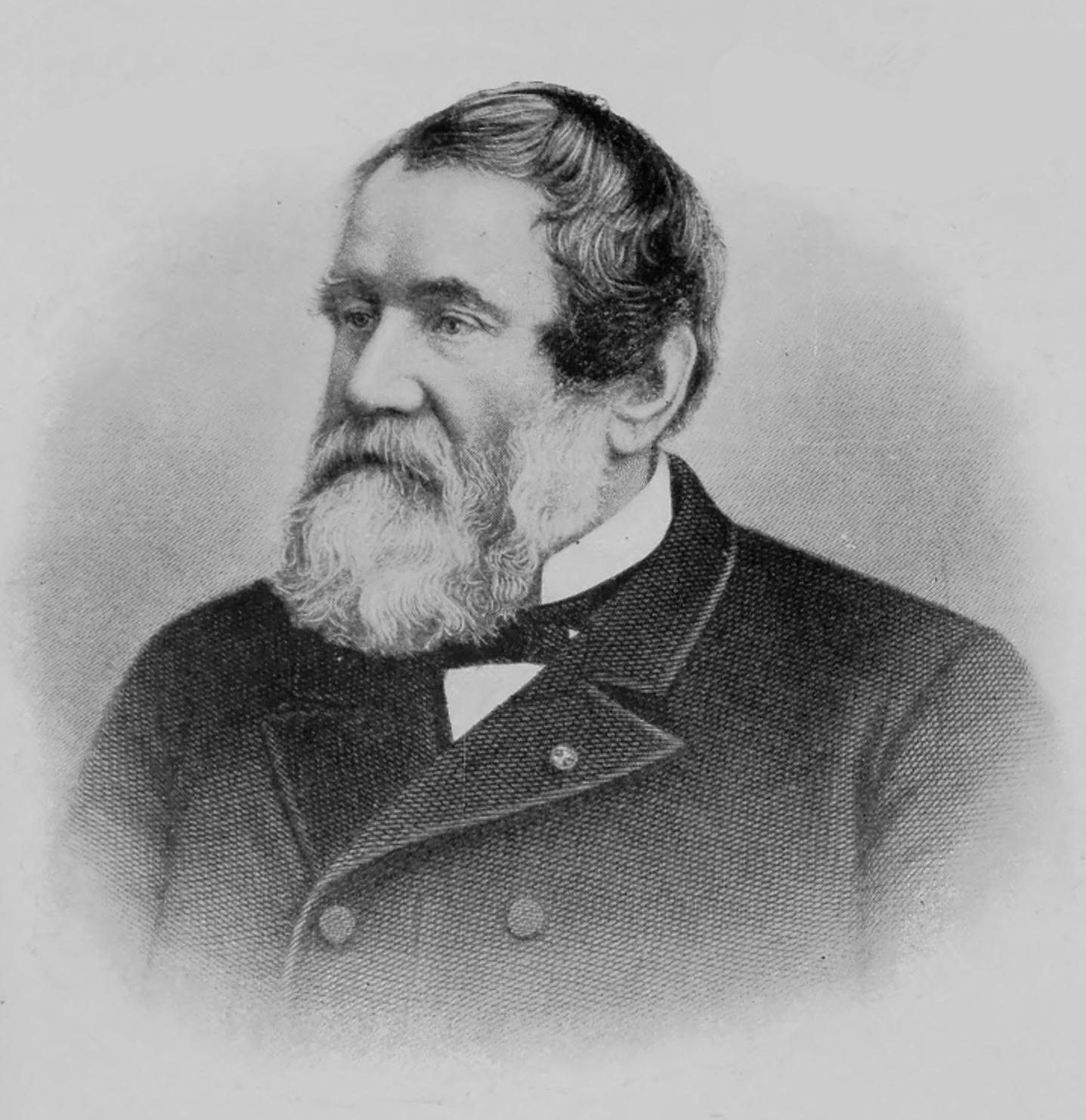
Cyrus Hall McCormick Sr., founder of the McCormick business dynasty

- Robert McCormick Jr. (1780–1846) was an American inventor who lived in rural Virginia. His maternal grandparents were Scottish immigrants, George Sanderson and Catharine (née Ross) Sanderson, and paternal grandparents were Thomas (1702–1762) and Elizabeth (née Carruth) McCormick, Presbyterian immigrants born in County Londonderry and County Antrim, Ireland respectively who married in 1728 and settled in Cumberland County, Pennsylvania in 1735.
- Cyrus Hall McCormick Sr. (1809–1884), entrepreneur, publisher, father of modern agriculture, and leading founder of McCormick Harvesting Machine Company which would later form part of International Harvester. A devout Presbyterian, he was the primary benefactor of the McCormick Theological Seminary in Chicago.
- William Sanderson McCormick (1815–1865), who was an inventor and co-founder of the McCormick Harvesting Machine Company (International Harvester). Third son of Robert Jr. and Polly. William died at an early age and his children were raised by their uncles.
- Leander James McCormick (1819–1900), an inventor and co-founder of the McCormick Harvesting Machine Company, he owned substantial real estate in downtown Chicago and Lake Forest, Illinois. In the 1880s, he donated the McCormick Observatory to the University of Virginia in an effort to help the South recover from the war. At the time it was the second largest telescope in the world and the largest in America. He married Henrietta Maria Hamilton (1822-1899) of Virginia, a direct descendant of the Dukes of Hamilton of Scotland.
- Robert Hall McCormick II (1847–1917) His chief interests were horses, yachting, and art. He owned one of the finest collections of British master paintings in the United States. With Bertha Palmer, he exhibited some of his paintings at the World's Columbian Exposition in 1893 and was a trustee of the Art Institute of Chicago. He owned two steam yachts: the Rapidan, which was wrecked in Delaware, and the Satilla, named after a river near the Jekyll Island Club and which became a naval ship during World War I. He married Sarah Lord Day (1850–1922), who was the daughter and granddaughter of founders of the law firm Lord Day & Lord and the lawyer for the McCormick Harvesting Machine Co.
- Robert Sanderson McCormick (1849–1919), a diplomat who served as the U.S. Minister to Austria-Hungary 1901–1902, U.S. Ambassador to Austria-Hungary 1902, U.S. Ambassador to Russia 1902–1905, U.S. Ambassador to France 1905–1907. He built the McCormick Villa in Washington, D.C., now the Brazilian Embassy. He was the son-in-law of Chicago Mayor and newspaper publisher Joseph Medill.
- William Grigsby McCormick (1851–1941), a Chicago businessman who was among the founders of Kappa Sigma fraternity at the University of Virginia.
- Henrietta Laura McCormick-Goodhart (1857–1932). One of the first American heiresses to marry an English aristocrat, she lived in England and, later, at her estate, Langley Park in Maryland. By order of Queen Victoria, her last name was officially changed to encompass her husband's name, Goodhart. She had two sons, Leander and Frederick. Leander was a main figure at the British Embassy in Washington, D.C.
- Leander Hamilton McCormick (1859–1934), art collector and inventor. He is credited with the creation of the study of Characterology. He had three sons: Leander James McCormick II, Edward Hamilton McCormick, and Alister Hamilton McCormick (1891–1921). Alister married Joan Tyndale Stevens, a niece of Charles Morton Astley, Lord Hastings. Leander II married the Comtesse de Fontarce et Flueries.
- Cyrus Hall McCormick Jr. (1859–1936), the head of International Harvester, was a music lover who brought Sergei Prokofiev to the United States. In 1923, he and his mother donated McCormick Hall to Princeton University. A member of the Jekyll Island Club, a founder of the Chicago Community Trust, and a financier of the World's Columbian Exposition.
- Anita McCormick Blaine (1866–1954), who founded the New World Foundation and also the Francis W. Parker School and the Laboratory School at the University of Chicago. Despite coming from a conservative family, she embraced progressive movements, such as the United Nations and the suffragist movement.
- Harold Fowler McCormick Sr. (1872–1941) who married Edith Rockefeller. Before their divorce, Edith and Harold were the wealthiest couple in Chicago and were great patrons of the Civic Opera. They built a massive estate, Villa Turicum, in Lake Forest, Illinois and he was a pioneer in aviation, running a number of successful flights, and donated the Harold F. McCormick Collection of Aeronautica at Princeton. His promotion of his second wife's music career was partial inspiration for Charles Foster Kane in the movie Citizen Kane.
- Elizabeth Day McCormick (1873–1957), who owned one of the finest and most complete textile and costume collections, now the Elizabeth Day McCormick Collection at the Museum of Fine Arts, Boston. To the University of Chicago she donated two very important early Greek texts, the Rockefeller-McCormick Manuscript, in memory of her cousin and fellow collector, Edith Rockefeller McCormick.
- Joseph Medill McCormick (1877–1925), who was a delegate to the Republican National Convention in 1916 and 1920, member of the Illinois Legislature, U.S. Representative from Illinois 1917–1919, and U.S. Senator from Illinois 1919–1925. Ruth was a Republican National Committeewoman 1924–1928, U.S. Representative from Illinois 1929–1931, and nominee for the U.S. Senate from Illinois in 1930.
- Robert Hall McCormick III (1878–1963). Alderman for Chicago's 21st Ward, and worked as a secretary to the Brazilian Ambassador in Rio de Janeiro. Welcomed Guglielmo Marconi to the U.S. in 1914. He also was the builder of Chicago's McCormick Building and the Roanoke Building. Maintained a Roman-style sailing ship, the San Marco, in Venice, Italy, which was sunk by the Nazis during World War II. He built the Apollo Theater and was director of the Civic Opera after the death of Edith R. McCormick.
- Ruth Hanna McCormick (1880–1944), the daughter of U.S. Senator Mark Hanna and Charlotte Augusta Rhodes, she was the wife of Joseph Medill McCormick, and after his death, the wife of U.S. Representative Albert G. Simms. She maintained a large farm in Byron, Illinois.
- Robert Rutherford McCormick (1880–1955), famous publisher of the Chicago Tribune and patriarch of Chicago. He was a delegate to the Republican National Convention in 1912, 1940, 1948 and 1952. He married twice and died childless. He considered his favorite niece, Ruth "Bazy" McCormick, to be his heir. Upon his death his estate became the Robert R. McCormick Foundation. McCormick Place is named for him as is the McCormick School of Engineering at Northwestern University. His estate, Cantigny in Wheaton, Illinois, is now a museum. (Joseph Medill Patterson (1879–1946), Illinois State Representative in 1903, was first cousin of J. Medill McCormick and Robert Rutherford McCormick through the Medill family.)
- William McCormick Blair Sr. (1884–1982), the founder of William Blair & Co. (which specialized in financing homes in the Midwest). He married Helen Hadduck Bowen (1890–1972), daughter of Joseph Tilton Bowen and Louise deKoven.
- Chauncey Brooks McCormick (1884–1954), the president of International Harvester. He married Marion Deering, heiress of the Deering Machine Company fortune that had merged with McCormick to form International Harvester. They owned Villa Vizcaya in Miami.
- William McCormick Blair Jr. (1916–2015), an investment banker who served as the U.S. Ambassador to Denmark 1961–1964 and the U.S. Ambassador to the Philippines 1964–1967.
- Brooks McCormick (1917–2006), who was the last McCormick to have a senior role at International Harvester; his wife Hope Baldwin McCormick (1919–1993) served in the Illinois House of Representatives.
- Ruth "Bazy" McCormick Miller Tankersley (1921–2013), a publisher and Arabian horse breeder.

== Family tree ==
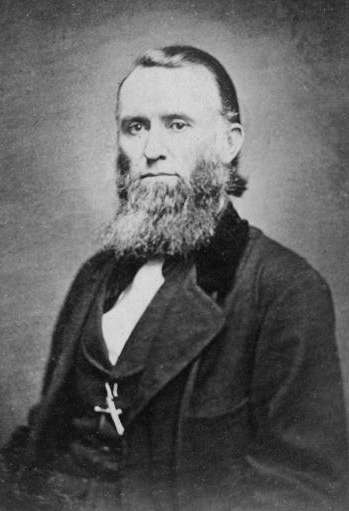
William Sanderson McCormick (1815–1865)

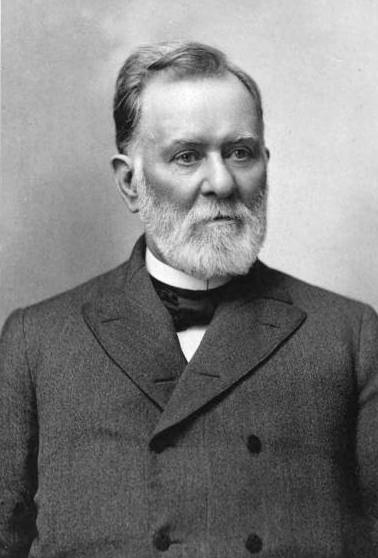
Leander James McCormick (1819–1900)

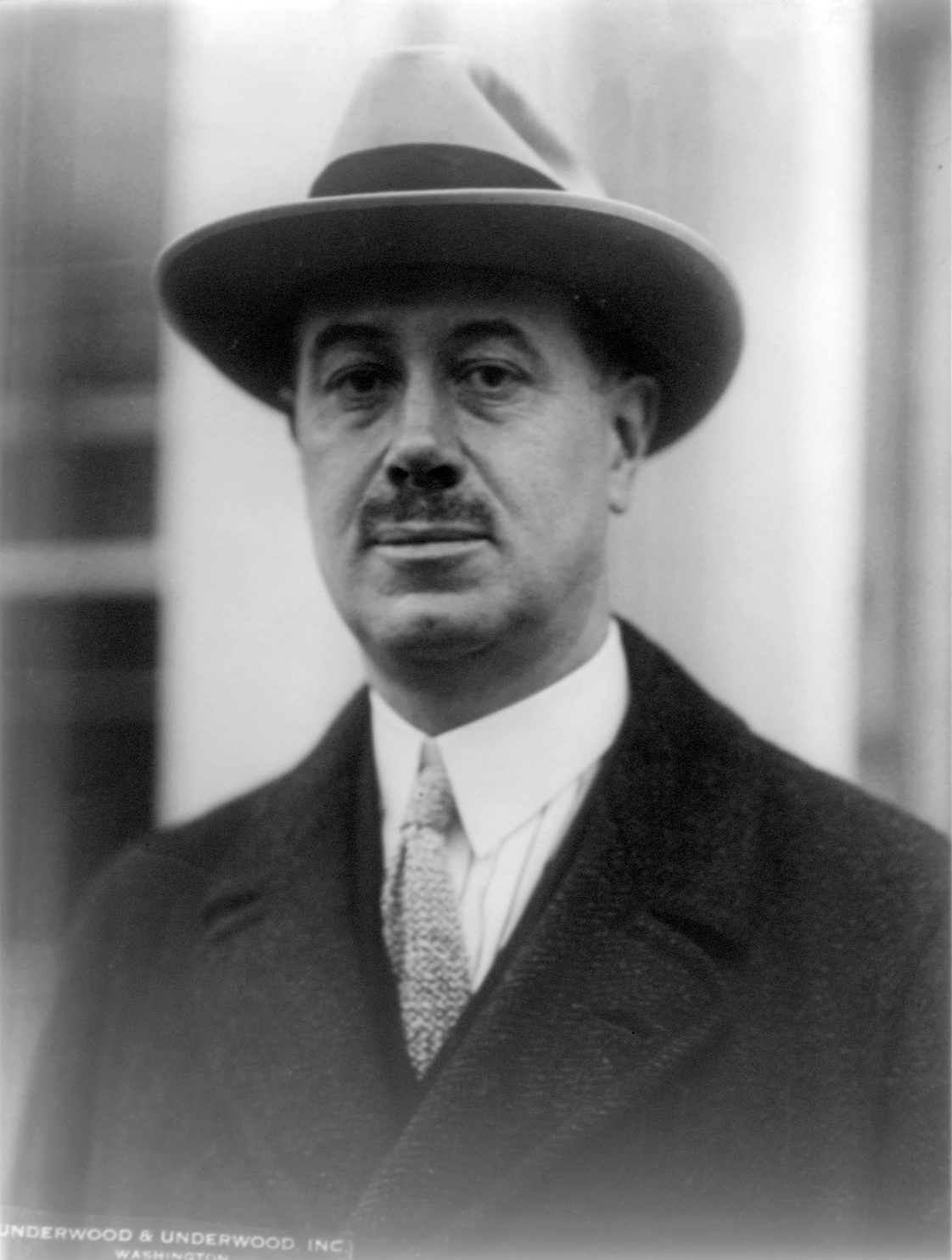
Robert Rutherford McCormick (1880–1955)

Three branches: (1) Cyrus-the McCormick Blaines and the Rockefeller McCormicks. (2) William-the Deering McCormicks, the Medill McCormicks, and the McCormick Blairs. (3) Leander-the Hall McCormicks, the McCormick-Goodharts, and the Hamilton McCormicks.

- Robert McCormick Jr. (1780–1846) ∞ 1808 Mary Ann "Polly" Hall (1780–1853).
  - Cyrus Hall McCormick Sr. (1809–1884) ∞ Nancy Fowler McCormick (1835–1923)
    - Cyrus Hall McCormick Jr. (1859–1936) ∞ 1889 Harriet Bradley Hammond (1862–1921).
      - Cyrus Hall McCormick III (1890–1970) ∞ Florence Nicks (née Sittenham) Davey (1888–1979).
      - Elizabeth McCormick (1892–1905).
      - Gordon McCormick (1894-1967).
    - Mary Virginia McCormick (1861–1941).
    - Anita McCormick (1866–1954) ∞ Emmons Blaine (1857–1892).
      - Emmons Blaine (1890–1918) ∞ 1917 Eleanor Blaine Gooding (1893–1972).
        - Anne Blaine (1918–1977) ∞ 1951 Gilbert Avery Harrison (1915–2008).
          - Joel Harrison (b. 1957).
    - Harold Fowler McCormick Sr. (1872–1941) ∞ (1) 1895 (div. 1921) Edith Rockefeller. ∞ (2) 1922 (div. 1931) Ganna Walska.
      - John Rockefeller McCormick (1897–1901).
      - Editha McCormick (1903–1904).
      - Harold Fowler McCormick Jr. (1898–1973) ∞ Anne Urquhart Brown (née Potter) Stillman (1879–1969).
      - Muriel McCormick (1903–1959) ∞ 1931 Elisha Dyer Hubbard (1878–1936).
      - Mathilde McCormick (1905–1947) ∞ 1923 Wilheim Max Oser (1877–1942).
    - Stanley Robert McCormick (1874–1947) ∞ 1904 Katharine Dexter (1875–1967).
  - Mary Caroline McCormick (1817–1888) ∞ 1847 Rev. James Shields IV (1812–1862).
    - James Hall Shields (1849–1916) ∞ Nellia Manville Culver (1858–1907).
  - William Sanderson McCormick (1815–1865) ∞ 1848 Mary Ann Grigsby (1828–1878).
    - Robert Sanderson McCormick (1849–1919) ∞ Katherine van Etta Medill (1853–1932).
      - Joseph Medill McCormick (1877–1925) ∞ Ruth Hanna (1880–1944).
        - Katrina McCormick (1913–2011), who married Courtlandt Dixon Barnes Jr.
        - John Medill McCormick (1916–1938).
        - Ruth "Bazy" McCormick (1921–2013) ∞ 1941 (1) (d. 1951) Peter Miller ∞ 1951 (2) Garvin Tankersley.
      - Katrine McCormick (1879–1879).
      - Robert Rutherford McCormick (1880–1955) ∞ 1915 (1) Amie Irwin Adams ∞ 1944 (2) Maryland Mathison Hooper.
    - William Grigsby McCormick (1851–1941) ∞ 1873 Eleanor Brooks (1852–1922).
      - Chauncey Brooks McCormick (1884–1954) ∞ Marion Deering (1886–1965).
        - Charles Deering McCormick (1915–1994) ∞ Nancy Hoskinson (1919–2017).
        - Brooks McCormick (1917–2006) ∞ Hope Baldwin McCormick (1919–1993).
        - Roger Simon McCormick (1920–1968).
      - Rubenia ("Ruby") McCormick (1891-1981)
        - Mark Hollingsworth
        - Valentine Hollingsworth
          - Tracy Hollingsworth
            - Zachary Hollingsworth Jones
            - Ashley New Jones
              - Alexandra Ann Bal
              - Charlotte Tracy Bal
              - Josephine Elizabeth Bal
              - James Valentine Bal
              - Catherine Winifred Bal
            - Schuyler Hamilton Jones
            - Owen Morgan Jones
        - Caroline Hollingsworth
    - Anna Reubenia McCormick (1860–1917) ∞ Edward T. Blair (1857–1939).
      - William McCormick Blair Sr. (1884–1982) ∞ Helen Hadduck Bowen (1890–1972).
        - Helen Bowen Blair (1913–1930).
        - Edward McCormick Blair (1915–2010).
        - William McCormick Blair Jr. (1916–2015) ∞ Catherine (née Gerlach) Jelke (born 1931).
          - William McCormick Blair III (1962–2004).
        - Bowen Blair (1918–2009).
      - Lucy McCormick Blair (1886–1978) ∞ Howard Linn.
  - Leander James McCormick (1819–1900) ∞ Henrietta Maria Hamilton (1822–1899).
    - Robert Hall McCormick II (1847–1917) ∞ Sarah Lord Day (1850–1922).
      - Elizabeth Day McCormick (1873–1957).
      - Robert Hall McCormick III (1878–1963) ∞ 1903 (div. 1944) Eleanor Russell Morris (1881–1970).
    - Elizabeth Maria McCormick (1850–1853).
    - Henrietta Laura McCormick-Goodhart (1857–1932) ∞ Frederick Emanuel McCormick-Goodhart (1854–1924).
      - Leander McCormick-Goodhart (1884–1965) ∞ 1928 Janet Phillips.
    - Leander Hamilton McCormick (1859–1934) ∞ 1884 Constance Plummer (1865–1938).
      - Leander James McCormick II (1888–1964) ∞ (1) 1917 (div. 1929) Alice Cudahy ∞ (2) (1933–1998) Renée de Fleurieu Fontarce, the Countess de Fleurieu.
        - Thierry Leander McCormick, (adopted) 1922–2003 ∞ Mari Bahe 1927–2019
          - Christopher Leander McCormick, 1952
          - Anthony D. McCormick, 1953
          - Matthew B. McCormick, 1960
      - Edward Hamilton McCormick (b. 1889) ∞ Phyllis Mary Samuelson.
      - Alister Hamilton McCormick (1891–1981) ∞ 1923 Joan Tyndale Stevens (1905–2004).

== Financial holdings ==
The following is a list of businesses in which the McCormick family have held a controlling or otherwise significant interest.

- Al-Marah Arabian Horse Farm
- Chicago Dock and Canal Company
- Chicago Tribune
- Duluth & Iron Range Railroad
- Illustrated Daily News
- Illinois Steel
- International Harvester
- McCormick Estates
- McCormick Harvesting Machine Company
- Rockford Consolidated Newspapers
- Walnut Grove Farm
- Washington Times-Herald
- WGN (AM)
- William Blair & Company

== Legacy ==
The McCormicks are remembered through their philanthropy and projects named in their honor, including:

- McCormick Place
- Fourth Presbyterian Church, Chicago
- University of Chicago
- McCormick Tribune Campus Center, Illinois Institute of Technology
- McCormick Hospital, Thailand
- McCormick Theological Seminary
- McCormick Hall, Princeton University
- McCormick Farm, Virginia Tech
- McCormick Courtyard, Art Institute of Chicago
- McCormick Observatory, University of Virginia
- Stanley McCormick Hall, MIT
- McCormick School of Engineering, Northwestern University
- McCormick Library, Washington & Lee University
- Chauncey and Marion Deering McCormick Foundation
- Elizabeth Day McCormick Collection, Museum of Fine Arts, Boston
- McCormick County, South Carolina
- Villa Vizcaya, Miami
- McCormick Library, Groton School
- Francis W. Parker School
- Laboratory School, University of Chicago
- McCormickville neighborhood, Chicago
- Robert R. McCormick Foundation
- Cantigny Park
- New World Foundation
- Roanoke Building
- Saint Barnabas on the Desert, Paradise Valley, Arizona
- McCormick Building 332 S. Michigan Ave., Chicago
- McCormick Wilderness, Baraga County, Michigan
- Brookfield Zoo
- Chicago History Museum
- Rush University Hospital
- United Artists Theater, Chicago
- McCormick Boulevard, Chicago
- McCormick Bridgehouse and Chicago River Museum
- The Island House, Elk Rapids Michigan
- BirdHouse at Lincoln Park Zoo

== Residences ==
- Walnut Grove, Raphine, Virginia
- Villa Turicum, Lake Forest, Illinois
- Walden, Lake Forest, Ill.
- House-in-the-Woods, Lake Forest, Ill.
- Cantigny, Wheaton, Illinois
- Langley Hall, Langley Park, Maryland
- Villa Vizcaya, Miami, Florida
- Crabtree Farm, Lake Forest, Ill.
- Castle Hill, Keswick, Virginia
- Clayton Lodge, Richfield Springs, New York
- Kildare, Huntsville, Alabama
- St. James Farm, Wheaton, Ill.
- Lotusland, Montecito, California
- Eastpoint, Seal Harbor, Maine
- Stanwood, Bar Harbor, Maine
- McCormick Farm, Steger, Illinois
- Mizzentop, Bar Harbor, Maine
- Burnmouth, Bar Harbor, Maine
- Gordon Hall, Dexter, Michigan
- Riven Rock, Santa Barbara, California
- McCormick Apartments, (Andrew Mellon Building), Washington, D.C.
- McCormick Villa, 3000 Massachusetts Ave., Washington, D.C. (Embassy of Brazil)
- 675 Rush St, Chicago
- 660 Rush St, Chicago
- 1000 Lake Shore Drive, Chicago
- 101 East Erie St, Chicago
- 50 East Huron St, Chicago
- 100 East Ontario St, Chicago
- Cable-McCormick mansion, 25 East Erie St., Chicago
- Patterson-McCormick mansion, Astor St., Chicago
- McCormick Ranch, Scottsdale, Arizona
- Deering Estate, Palmetto Bay, Florida

== See also ==
- List of United States political families
