= Cyrus McCormick Jr. =

American businessman

- Portrait of McCormick, c. 1905
- Born: Cyrus Hall McCormick Jr. May 16, 1859; Washington, D.C.
- Died: June 2, 1936 (aged 77); Chicago, Illinois
- Burial place: Graceland Cemetery
- Education: Princeton University
- Occupation: Businessman
- Spouse: Harriet Bradley Hammond (m. 1889)
- Children: 3
- Parent(s): Cyrus Hall McCormick Sr. Nancy Fowler
- Relatives: McCormick family

Cyrus Hall McCormick Jr. (May 16, 1859 – June 2, 1936) was an American businessman. He was president of the McCormick Harvesting Machine Company from 1884 to 1902. His tenure was marked by bitter conflict with the union, culminating in the death of two striking workers on May 3, 1886, the event which precipitated the Haymarket affair.

== Life and career ==
McCormick was the eldest child of inventor Cyrus Hall McCormick Sr. and philanthropist Nancy Fowler. He was born in Washington, D.C., on May 16, 1859. McCormick married Harriet Bradley Hammond on March 5, 1889. They had three children – Cyrus Hall McCormick III was born September 22, 1890; Elizabeth McCormick was born July 12, 1892; and Gordon McCormick was born June 21, 1894.

He was president of the McCormick Harvesting Machine Company from 1884 to 1902. In 1885, striking workers forced McCormick to restore a 15 percent wage cut. From then on, McCormick was set on breaking the union. He replaced iron molders, skilled workers who had led the 1885 walkout, with new machinery. In February 1886, he locked out workers, replacing them with non-union labor (“scabs”), under the protection of 300 armed Pinkertons. On May 3, 1886, a clash occurred between striking workers and scabs. The police fired into the crowd of unarmed workers, wounding many and killing two. It was in response to this incident, that the Haymarket meeting of May 4, 1886 was called. McCormick was later president of the merged International Harvester Company starting in 1902. He was also a member of the Jekyll Island Club (aka The Millionaires Club) on Jekyll Island, Georgia.

McCormick's daughter, Elizabeth, died at the age of twelve; in 1908, her parents established the Elizabeth McCormick Memorial Fund, which supported child health and welfare efforts in Chicago and nationwide for many years. Physician and public health advocate Caroline Hedger worked for the fund from 1920 to 1942.

On June 2, 1936, McCormick died in Chicago and was buried at Graceland Cemetery. His brother Harold Fowler McCormick was the husband of Edith Rockefeller. McCormick's son Cyrus Hall McCormick III wrote a history of his grandfather's life and times, his company, and the successor company.

== Family tree ==
McCormick Chicago family tree

Robert McCormick Jr. (1780–1846) | Mary Ann Hall (1780–1853)
Nancy Fowler (1835–1923) | Cyrus Hall McCormick Sr. (1809–1884) | William Sanderson McCormick (1815–1865) | Mary Ann Grigsby (1828–1878) | Leander James McCormick (1819–1900)
Cyrus Hall McCormick Jr. (1859–1936) | Anita McCormick Blaine (1866–1954) | Harold Fowler McCormick (1872–1941) | Robert Sanderson McCormick (1849–1919) | William Grigsby McCormick (1851–1941) | Anna Reubenia McCormick (1860–1917) | Leander Hamilton McCormick (1859–1934)
Joseph Medill McCormick (1877–1925) | Ruth Hanna (1880–1944) | Robert Rutherford McCormick (1880–1955) | Chauncey Brooks McCormick (1884–1954) | William McCormick Blair Sr. (1884–1982)
Bazy Tankersley (1921-2013) | Hope Baldwin (1919–1993) | Brooks McCormick (1917–2006) | William McCormick Blair Jr. (1916–2015)

Notes:

See Chaim M. Rosenberg, The International Harvester Company: A History of the Founding Families and Their Machines (McFarland, 2019). online

== See also ==
- McCormick reaper
