= Robert McCormick (Virginia inventor) =

American inventor (1780–1846)

Robert McCormick Jr.
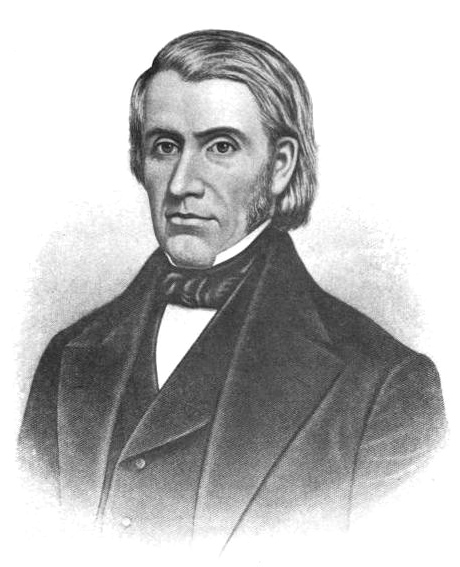
- Born: June 8, 1780; Rockbridge County, Virginia
- Died: July 4, 1846 (aged 66); Spottswood, Augusta County, Virginia, USA
- Spouse: Mary Ann Hall (m. 1808)
- Children: Cyrus Hall McCormick; Robert Hall McCormick; Susan Jane McCormick; William Sanderson McCormick; Mary Caroline McCormick; Leander James McCormick; John Prestly McCormick; Amanda Joanna McCormick
- Parent(s): Robert McCormick Sr. Martha Sanderson
- Relatives: McCormick family

Robert McCormick Jr. (June 8, 1780 – July 4, 1846) was an American inventor who invented numerous devices including a version of the reaper. His eldest son Cyrus McCormick patented this in 1834 and it became the foundation of the International Harvester Company. Robert was also the patriarch of the McCormick family that became influential throughout the world, especially in large cities such as Chicago, Washington, D.C., and New York City.

== Early life ==
McCormick was born June 8, 1780, on the family estate of Walnut Grove in Rockbridge County, Virginia, in the Shenandoah Valley on the western side of the Blue Ridge Mountains. His parents were Revolutionary War veteran Robert McCormick Sr. and Martha (née Sanderson) McCormick. Robert Jr. had five elder siblings: George, Martha, Elizabeth, William, and James.

McCormick's maternal grandparents were Scottish immigrants, George Sanderson and Catharine (née Ross) Sanderson. His paternal grandparents were Thomas (1702–1762) and Elizabeth (née Carruth) McCormick, Presbyterian immigrants born in County Londonderry and County Antrim, Ireland respectively who married in 1728 and settled in Cumberland County, Pennsylvania in 1735.

== Career ==
McCormick and his wife Mary raised their eight children on the farm who grew up helping in the shop and the mill. He frequently busied himself with small gadgets and inventions around the farm. By 1809, McCormick had constructed a partially completed reaper. He eventually decided to formalize some of his work when he applied for a patent in 1830 for a "hemp-break", a device for breaking hemp and flax. He also produced a threshing machine, a clover sheller of stone, a blacksmith's bellows and a hill-side plow.

By 1831, he had completed a reaper. His wife Polly encouraged him to give it to their assertive and business-minded son Cyrus, who was able to improve and patent it in 1834 and establish the McCormick Harvesting Machine Company which led to the great wealth the family accumulated.

== Personal life ==
On February 11, 1808, McCormick was married to Mary Ann McChesney Hall (1780–1853), a daughter of Patrick Hall and Susan (née McChesney) Hall, and was granted ownership of Walnut Grove, the family estate, in 1810. Together, Robert and Polly were the parents of eight children:

- Cyrus Hall McCormick (1809–1884), who moved to Chicago and married Nettie Fowler in 1858.
- Robert Hall McCormick (1810–1826).
- Susan Jane McCormick (1813–1826).
- William Sanderson McCormick (1815–1865), who joined Cyrus in Chicago and married Mary Ann Grigsby in 1848.
- Mary Caroline McCormick (1817–1888), who married Rev. James Shields IV in 1847.
- Leander James McCormick (1819–1900), who also joined Cyrus in Chicago and married Henrietta Maria Hamilton in 1845.
- John Prestly McCormick (1820–1849).
- Amanda Joanna McCormick (1822–1891), who married Hugh Adams in 1845.

He died on July 4, 1846. He and his wife were buried in the cemetery of the Old Providence Stone Church just north of the estate.

=== Legacy ===
In 2002, Robert Jr. and his three surviving sons had a variety of wheat named after them, for "inventing, perfecting, manufacturing, and marketing of the mechanical grain reaper [which] ushered in the era of modern agriculture and wrought one of the greatest advancements in agricultural history." McCormick is a soft red winter wheat (Triticum aestivum L.) developed and released in May 2002 by the Virginia Agricultural Experiment Station.

== Family tree ==
McCormick Chicago family tree

Robert McCormick Jr. (1780–1846)	Mary Ann Hall (1780–1853)
Nancy Fowler (1835–1923)	Cyrus Hall McCormick Sr. (1809–1884)	William Sanderson McCormick (1815–1865)	Mary Ann Grigsby (1828–1878)	Leander James McCormick (1819–1900)
Cyrus Hall McCormick Jr. (1859–1936)	Anita McCormick Blaine (1866–1954)	Harold Fowler McCormick (1872–1941)	Robert Sanderson McCormick (1849–1919)	William Grigsby McCormick (1851–1941)	Anna Reubenia McCormick (1860–1917)	Leander Hamilton McCormick (1859–1934)
Joseph Medill McCormick (1877–1925)	Ruth Hanna (1880–1944)	Robert Rutherford McCormick (1880–1955)	Chauncey Brooks McCormick (1884–1954)	William McCormick Blair Sr. (1884–1982)
Bazy Tankersley (1921-2013)	Hope Baldwin (1919–1993)	Brooks McCormick (1917–2006)	William McCormick Blair Jr. (1916–2015)

Notes:

See Chaim M. Rosenberg, The International Harvester Company: A History of the Founding Families and Their Machines (McFarland, 2019). online

== See also ==
- McCormick family
- McCormick reaper
