= Caroline Hedger =

American nurse, physician and writer

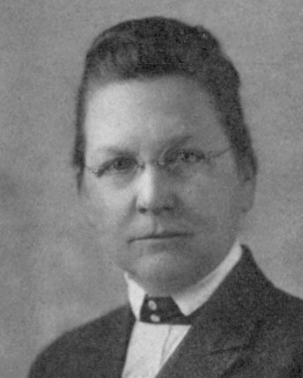
- Born: January 12, 1868; Braceville Township, Ohio
- Died: July 10, 1951 (aged 83); Clinton, Connecticut
- Education: Berea College; Wellesley College; Northwestern University Women's Medical School; Rush Medical College
- Occupations: Nurse, physician, writer

Caroline B. Hedger (January 12, 1868 – July 10, 1951) was an American nurse, physician, and writer on public health issues.

== Early life ==
Hedger was born in Braceville Township, Ohio on January 12, 1868, the daughter of John R. Hedger (1832–1881) and Mary Louise Caskey Hedger (1846–1929; later Seymour). She was educated at Willoughby High School in Willoughby, Ohio, Berea College in Kentucky (1888–1889) and at Wellesley College in Northampton, Massachusetts (1889–1890). From 1890 to 1899 she trained and worked as a nurse, getting a degree at the Illinois Training School for Nurses. She received a medical degree from the Northwestern University Women's Medical School in 1899 and another from Rush Medical College in 1904.

== Public health career ==
It was around 1904 that Hedger began to live and work at the University of Chicago's settlement house in Chicago's "Packingtown" neighborhood near the meat packing plants. After the publication of Upton Sinclair's The Jungle in 1906, Hedger wrote an article entitled "The Unhealthfulness of Packingtown" which appeared in the business magazine The World's Work; in it she largely confirmed Sinclair's picture of life in Packingtown and recommended improving workers' living and working conditions, reducing crowding, inspecting housing, educating residents on cooking and ventilation, and watching carefully for signs of tuberculosis. She argued that the health of Americans depended on the good health of the packinghouse workers. In 1912 Hedger published a paper which argued that low wages in Packingtown contributed to low academic performance and stunted growth among immigrant workers there.

Hedger worked as a physician for the Women's Trade Union League in Chicago and spoke at the organization's conference of her concerns that working conditions and low wages negatively impacted women's ability to successfully run their homes and raise children. She also organized efforts to control tuberculosis among League members. She advocated for businesses to take responsibility for promoting good health among their workers and in the neighborhoods in which they lived, because healthy workers were more productive.

In 1915, with the support of the Chicago Women's Club, Hedger spent six months in Belgium working with refugees, helping prevent typhoid.

Hedger was hired by the US Department of Labor in 1916 and wrote a number of article between 1917 and 1924 about Americanization of immigrants; Hedger viewed Americanization as vital to ensuring that immigrants were able to navigate the health care system and receive proper care. She published a Well Baby Primer in 1919 which taught good practices for baby care while also teaching English and instructing immigrants on how to deal with matters like birth certificates and naturalization.

Hedger also wrote about nurses, stressing the importance of good physical and mental health, and advocating that nurses develop outside interests like art or music to "grow a soul".

Starting in 1920, Hedger worked with the Elizabeth McCormick Memorial Fund, established by International Harvester president Cyrus McCormick Jr. in honor of a daughter who died young, to study ways to improve the lives of children. Hedger traveled, lectured and wrote books giving her views on children's health issues, and continued practicing medicine until 1938. She left the Elizabeth McCormick Memorial Fund in 1942.

== Later life ==
Hedger then moved to a farm near Laporte, Indiana and later to Clinton, Connecticut. She died there on July 10, 1951, suffering from arteriosclerosis and Parkinson's disease.

== Legacy ==
The Chicago Housing Authority named an apartment building, the Caroline Hedger Apartments, after Hedger.
