= Nancy Fowler McCormick =

American philanthropist (1835–1923)

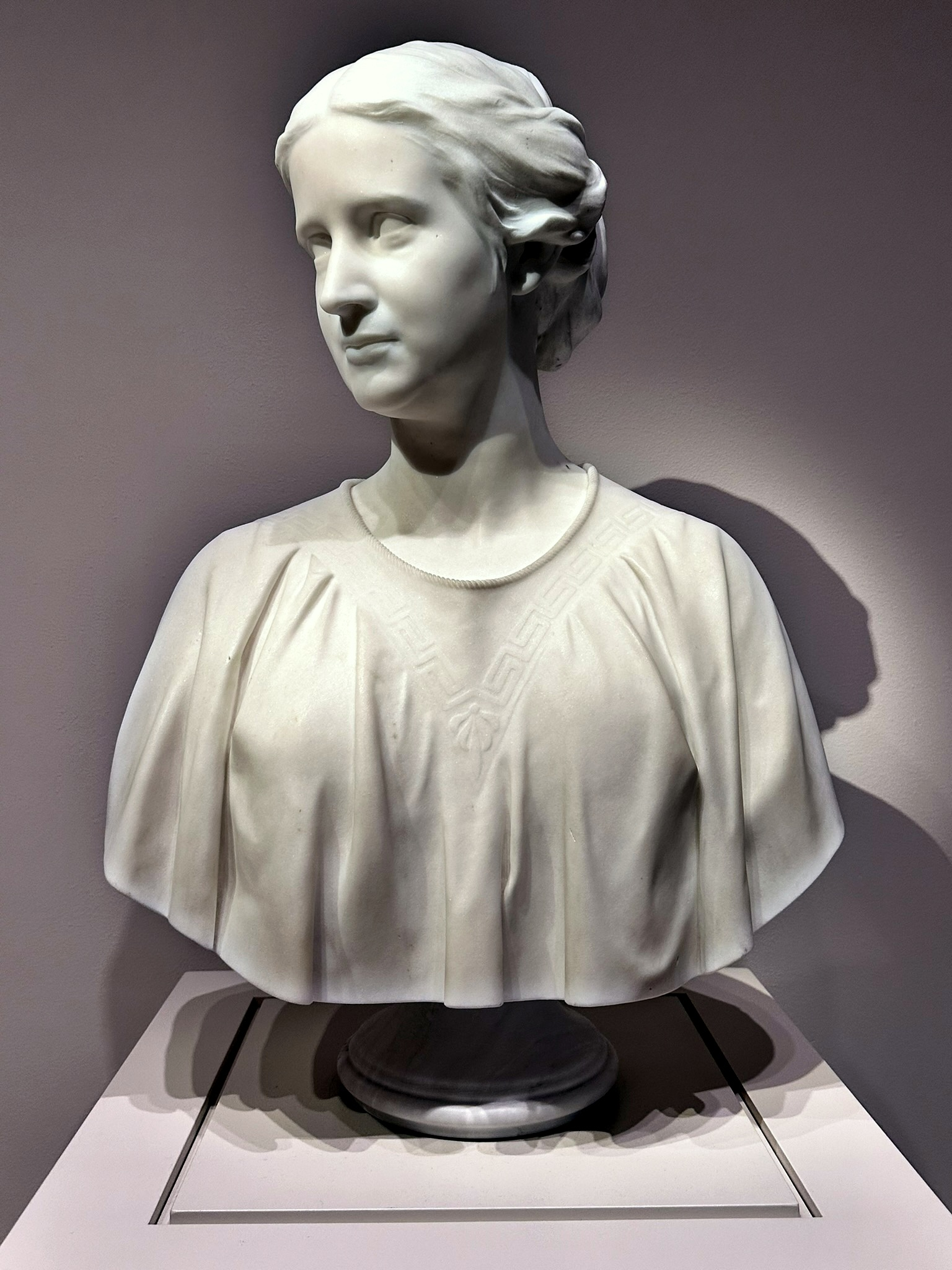
- A bust of McCormick by Erastus Dow Palmer
- Born: Nancy Maria Fowler; February 8, 1835; Brownsville, New York, U.S.
- Died: July 5, 1923 (aged 88); Lake Forest, Illinois, U.S.
- Education: Emma Willard School
- Spouse: Cyrus Hall McCormick (m. 1858; died 1884)
- Children: 7
- Relatives: McCormick family

Nancy Maria "Nettie" McCormick (née Fowler; February 8, 1835 – July 5, 1923) was an American philanthropist. Through marriage, she became a member of the prominent McCormick family.

== Early life ==
Nettie was born on February 8, 1835, at Brownsville in Ontario County, New York. She was the daughter of Melzer Fowler (1803–1835), a prosperous farmer who died a month before her birth, and Clarissa Fowler (née Spicer; 1805–1842), who died when she was seven years old. She was raised by her grandmother in Clayton, New York, and attended Emma Willard School in Troy, New York.

== Marriage and children ==
In 1857, while visiting friends in Chicago, Nettie met Cyrus Hall McCormick (1809–1884), the eldest son of inventor Robert McCormick and Mary Ann "Polly" McCormick (née Hall). Cyrus and Nettie were married in 1858.

Together, they were the parents of seven children:

- Cyrus Hall McCormick Jr. (1859–1936), who married Harriet Bradley Hammond in 1889.
- Mary Virginia McCormick (1861–1941), who suffered from schizophrenia.
- Robert McCormick III (1863–1865), who died young.
- Anita Eugenie McCormick (1866–1954), who married Emmons Blaine, son of the U.S. Secretary of State James G. Blaine, in 1889.
- Alice McCormick (1870–1871), who died young.
- Harold Fowler McCormick (1872–1941), who married Edith Rockefeller, youngest daughter of Standard Oil co-founder John D. Rockefeller and Laura Spelman Rockefeller.
- Stanley Robert McCormick (1874–1947), who married Katharine Dexter. Stanley also suffered from schizophrenia, and his life inspired the 1998 novel Riven Rock by T. Coraghessan Boyle.

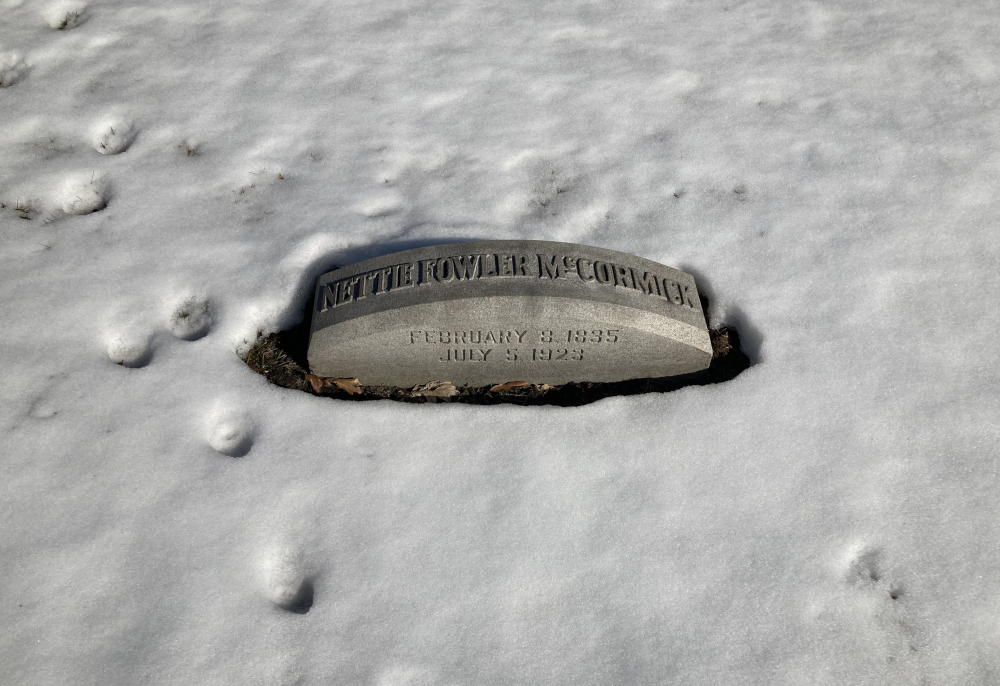
McCormick's grave at Graceland Cemetery

On May 13, 1884, her husband died at their home in Chicago. On July 5, 1923, after a week's illness, Nettie died at her home in Lake Forest in Lake County, Illinois. She was buried alongside her husband at Graceland Cemetery in Chicago.

== Business and philanthropy ==
While Cyrus was working out a controversy involving his patent of the reaper, they lived in Washington, DC. She had a keen business sense and became a great asset to her husband. Nettie became his financial counselor and oversaw many of the business affairs. She toured expositions in McCormick's interest, making contacts for the company. In 1871, the Great Chicago Fire destroyed the McCormick Harvesting Machine Company. However, despite Cyrus' thoughts of retirement afterward, Nettie insisted on rebuilding even larger than before.

The McCormicks provided $100,000 to bring the Hanover Seminary to Chicago. The school was renamed McCormick Theological Seminary soon after Cyrus's death in 1884. Nettie continued to fund buildings, endowing professorships and scholarships at the seminary even after his death. Nettie donated to over forty schools and colleges. She was said to have given more money to the Presbyterian Church than any other "citizen of the United States." At the time of her death, she left more than $1 million to be divided among various institutions. At Tusculum College, one of the many colleges Nettie supported, every September 13 observes Nettie Fowler McCormick Service Day. On this day, students perform community service in her honor.

== See also ==
- McCormick reaper
