= Medill McCormick =

American newspaper publisher and politician (1877–1925)

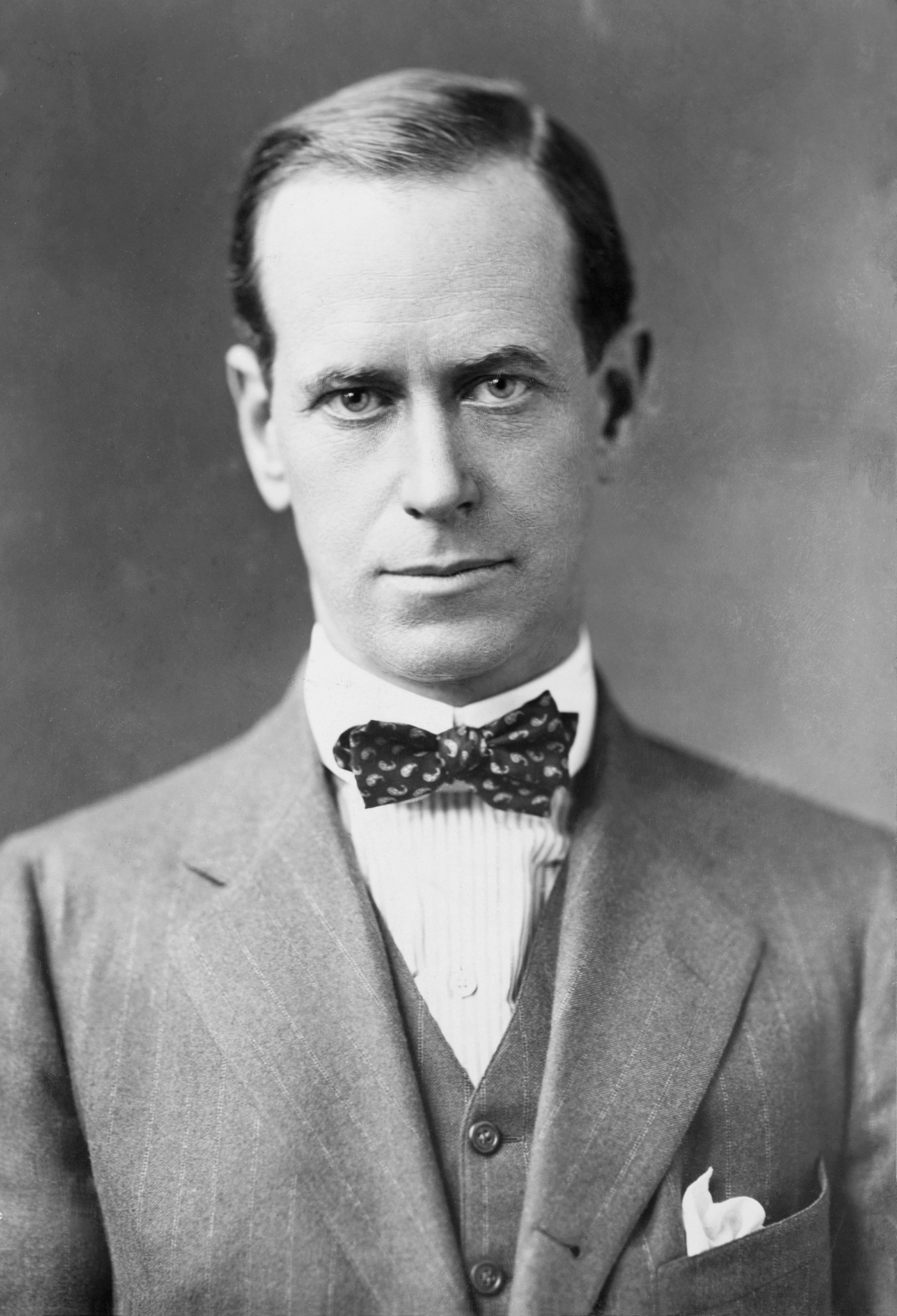
- McCormick in 1912

United States Senator from Illinois
- In office March 4, 1919 – February 25, 1925
- Preceded by: J. Hamilton Lewis
- Succeeded by: Charles S. Deneen

Member of the U.S. House of Representatives from Illinois's at-large district
- In office March 4, 1917 – March 3, 1919
- Preceded by: Burnett M. Chiperfield
- Succeeded by: Richard Yates

Member of the Illinois House of Representatives
- In office 1913–1917

Personal details
- Born: Joseph Medill McCormick; May 16, 1877 Chicago, Illinois, U.S.
- Died: February 25, 1925 (aged 47) Washington, D.C., U.S.
- Party: Republican
- Spouse: Ruth Hanna (m. 1903)
- Children: 3, including Bazy
- Parent(s): Robert Sanderson McCormick; Katherine Medill
- Education: Yale University

Joseph Medill McCormick (May 16, 1877 – February 25, 1925) was an American politician and newspaper publisher from McCormick family in Chicago. After working as a publisher for some time and becoming part owner of the Chicago Tribune, which his maternal grandfather had owned, he entered politics.

After serving in the State House, he was elected both as a representative in the United States Congress and later as a U.S. senator from Illinois.

== Early life ==
Joseph Medill McCormick was born in Chicago on May 16, 1877. His father was Robert Sanderson McCormick (1849–1919), a future diplomat and nephew of industrialist Cyrus McCormick.

McCormick was an early pupil at Ludgrove School when his father was based in Europe. He later attended the Groton School, a preparatory school at Groton, Massachusetts. He graduated from Yale University in 1900, where he was elected to the secret society Scroll and Key.

He worked as a newspaper reporter and publisher, and became an owner of the Chicago Daily Tribune. He later purchased interests in The Cleveland Leader and Cleveland News. In 1901 he served as a war correspondent in the Philippine Islands.

=== Marriage and family ===
In 1903 he married Ruth Hanna, daughter of the Ohio Senator Mark Hanna. They had three children:

- Ruth "Bazy" McCormick, (1921–2013) who married Peter Miller and then Garvin Tankersley. As Bazy Miller, she founded Al-Marah Arabians, a breeding and training farm for Arabian horses formerly in Tucson, Arizona, which operates in Florida, under the ownership of her son, Mark Miller.
- Katrina McCormick (1913–2011), who married Courtlandt Dixon Barnes Jr.
- John Medill McCormick, called "Johnny", died in a mountain-climbing accident in 1938.

== The Chicago Tribune ==
McCormick was a grandson of the Tribune owner Joseph Medill. His mother Katherine Medill McCormick hoped that leadership of the paper would pass from her brother-in-law, Robert Wilson Patterson, to her first son. Joseph Medill McCormick took over much of the management of the paper between 1903 and 1907, but became increasingly depressed and developed alcoholism. In 1907–1908, he spent some time under the care of the psychoanalyst Carl Jung in Zurich, and subsequently followed Jung's advice to detach himself from the family newspaper.

His younger brother, the famed "Colonel" Robert McCormick (1880–1955) became involved in the newspaper, worked closely on it for four decades, and was a leading isolationist figure in the Republican Party.

== Political career ==
McCormick was vice chairman of the national campaign committee of the Progressive Republican movement from 1912 to 1914. He was elected to the Illinois House of Representatives in 1912 and 1914.

Afterward he advanced to national office, being elected to the United States House of Representatives, where he served one term from March 4, 1917, to March 3, 1919. He was elected to the United States Senate in 1918, and served from March 4, 1919, until his death at age 48 in 1925. In the Senate, McCormick was chairman of the Committee on Expenditures in the Department of Labor and the Committee on Expenditures in Executive Departments.

In the primary election of 1924, McCormick lost the Republican U.S. Senate nomination to Charles S. Deneen, who had previously served as the 23rd governor of Illinois. Deenen defeated McCormick by a narrow 0.69% margin (only 5,944 votes).

== Death ==
McCormick died on February 25, 1925, in his hotel suite at the Hamilton Hotel in Washington, D.C. Although it was not publicized as such at the time, his death was considered to be a suicide. At the time of his death, McCormick was about to leave office. His reelection loss is believed to have contributed to his apparent suicide.

== See also ==
- List of members of the United States Congress who died in office (1900–1949)

Party political offices
| First | Republican nominee for U.S. Senator from Illinois (Class 2); 1918 | Succeeded by Charles S. Deneen |
U.S. House of Representatives
| Preceded by Burnett M. Chiperfield | Member of the U.S. House of Representatives from Illinois's at-large congressional district 1917–1919 | Succeeded by Richard Yates |
U.S. Senate
| Preceded by J. Hamilton Lewis | Class 2 U.S. Senator from Illinois; 1919–1925; Served alongside: Lawrence Yates Sherman, William B. McKinley | Succeeded by Charles S. Deneen |
