= Harold Fowler McCormick =

American businessman (1872–1941)

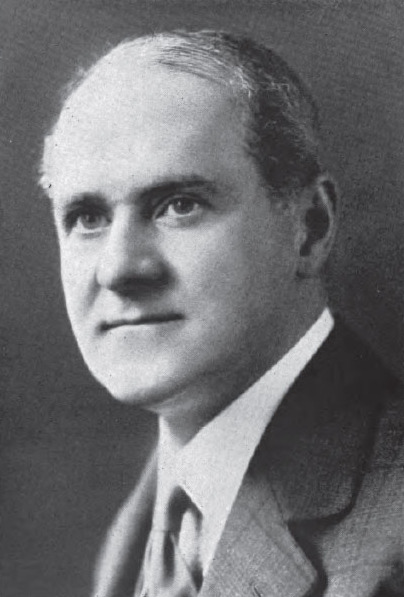
- Born: May 2, 1872; Chicago, Illinois, US
- Died: October 16, 1941 (aged 69); Beverly Hills, California, US
- Burial place: Graceland Cemetery
- Occupation: Businessman
- Employer: International Harvester Company
- Spouses: Edith Rockefeller (m. 1895; div. 1921) Ganna Walska (m. 1922; div. 1931)
- Children: 5
- Parent(s): Cyrus Hall McCormick; Nancy Fowler McCormick
- Relatives: McCormick family

Harold Fowler McCormick (May 2, 1872 – October 16, 1941) was an American businessman. He was chairman of the board of International Harvester Company and a member of the McCormick family. Through his first wife, Edith Rockefeller, he became a trustee of the Rockefeller Foundation. In 1948 he was awarded the Henry Laurence Gantt Medal by the American Management Association and the American Society of Mechanical Engineers (ASME).

== Early life ==
Harold Fowler McCormick was born in Chicago May 2, 1872, to inventor Cyrus Hall McCormick (1809–1884) and philanthropist Nancy Fowler (1835–1923). During the 1890s, he competed in the US National Tennis Championships.

== Career ==
As an officer of the Aero Club of Illinois, founded on February 10, 1910, McCormick became the third president in 1912, following Octave Chanute and James E. Plew. In 1914, McCormick, Plew, and Bion J. Arnold attempted to form a commuter airline which they announced would begin service in May, "using seaplanes to ferry passengers between various North Shore suburbs and Grant Park and the South Shore Country Club, of which he was a founder. Lake Shore Airline, which had two seaplanes, was intended to be a profit-making venture charging a steep twenty-eight-dollar round-trip fare between Lake Forest and downtown Chicago on four daily scheduled circuits. However, Chicago's irregular weather, especially the crosswinds, made a shambles of schedules, and the airline disappeared before the end of the year." McCormick became chairman of the board of International Harvester Company in 1935, replacing his older brother Cyrus Jr. (1859–1936).

== Personal life ==
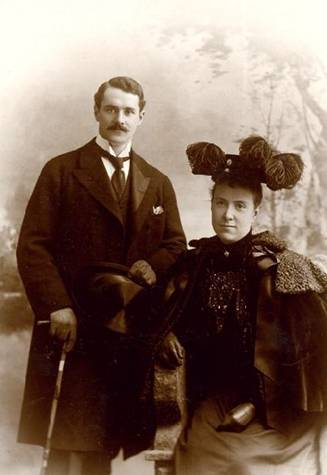
Harold Fowler McCormick with his first wife, Edith Rockefeller, in 1895

On November 26, 1895, McCormick married Edith Rockefeller (1872–1932), the youngest daughter of Standard Oil co-founder John D. Rockefeller and schoolteacher Laura Celestia "Cettie" Spelman. McCormick became the third inaugural trustee of the Rockefeller Foundation. He was also a trustee of the Rockefeller-created University of Chicago. He and Edith resided at 1000 Lake Shore Drive in Chicago and were the parents of five children before their divorce in December 1921:

- John Rockefeller McCormick (1897–1901), who died from scarlet fever.
- Editha McCormick (1903–1904), who also died young.
- Harold Fowler McCormick Jr. (1898–1973), who married Anne Urquhart Brown "Fifi" (née Potter) Stillman (1879–1969), who had previously been married to James A. Stillman, and was the daughter of James Brown Potter and Mary Cora Urquhart.
- Muriel McCormick (1903–1959), who married Elisha Dyer Hubbard (1878-1936), a nephew of Elisha Dyer Jr. and grandson of Elisha Dyer (both Rhode Island governors), in 1931.
- Mathilde McCormick (1905–1947), who married Wilheim Max Oser (1877–1942), a Swiss riding instructor, in April 1923.

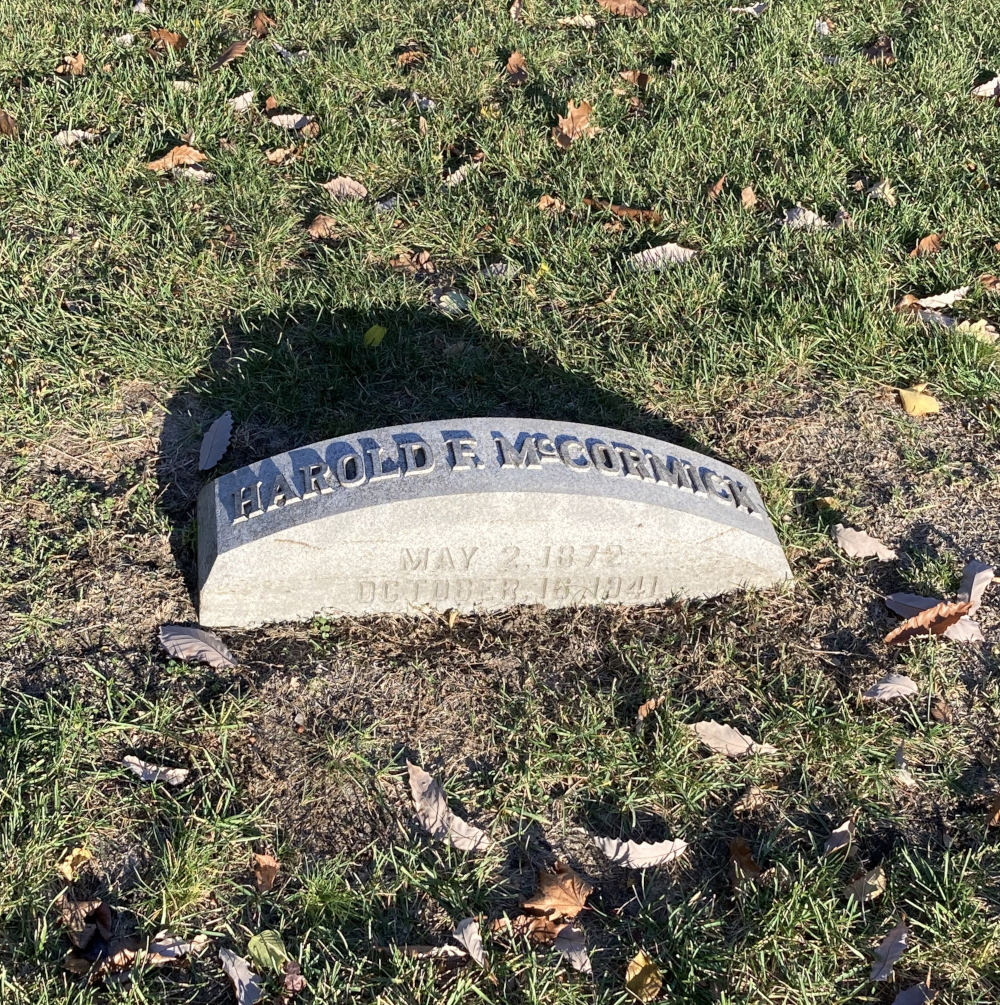
McCormick's grave at Graceland Cemetery

After his divorce from Edith, and before his second marriage, McCormick sought to fortify himself by undergoing an operation by Serge Voronoff, a surgeon who specialized in transplanting animal glands into aging men with impotency. In 1922, McCormick married Polish opera singer Ganna Walska. They divorced in 1931. McCormick died on October 16, 1941, of a cerebral hemorrhage, at his home in Beverly Hills, California. He was buried at Graceland Cemetery in Chicago.

=== Legacy ===
Orson Welles claimed that McCormick's lavish promotion of Walska's opera career—despite her renown as a terrible singer—was a direct influence on the screenplay for Citizen Kane, wherein the titular character does much the same for his second wife.

== See also ==
- Rockefeller family
