= Bazy Tankersley =

American horse breeder (1921–2013)

- Tankersley in 2003
- Born: Ruth Elizabeth McCormick; March 7, 1921; Chicago, Illinois, U.S.
- Died: February 5, 2013 (aged 91); Tucson, Arizona, U.S.
- Occupations: Arabian horse breeder, newspaper publisher
- Known for: Owner of Al-Marah Arabians
- Spouses: M. Peter Miller, Jr. (m. 1941; div. 1951) Garvin E. "Tank" Tankersley (m. 1951; died 1997)
- Children: 3
- Parents: Joseph Medill McCormick; Ruth Hanna
- Family: McCormick family

Ruth Elizabeth "Bazy" Tankersley (née McCormick, formerly Miller; March 7, 1921 – February 5, 2013) was an American breeder of Arabian horses and a newspaper publisher. She was a daughter of U.S. Senator Joseph Medill McCormick. Her mother was progressive Republican U.S. Representative Ruth Hanna McCormick, making Tankersley a granddaughter of Senator Mark Hanna of Ohio. Although Tankersley was involved with conservative Republican causes as a young woman, including a friendship with Senator Joseph McCarthy, her progressive roots reemerged in later years. By the 21st century, she had become a strong supporter of environmental causes and backed Barack Obama for president in 2008.

Tankersley's father died when she was a child. When her mother remarried, the family moved to the southwestern United States, where Tankersley spent considerable time riding horses. She became particularly enamored of the Arabian breed after she was given a part-Arabian to ride. At the age of 18, she began working as a reporter for a newspaper published by her mother. She later ran a newspaper in Illinois with her first husband, Peter Miller. In 1949, she became the publisher of the conservative Washington Times-Herald. That paper was owned by her uncle, the childless Robert McCormick, who viewed Tankersley as his heir until the two had a falling-out over editorial control of the newspaper and her relationship with Garvin Tankersley, who became her second husband. After The Washington Post absorbed the Times-Herald, she shifted to full-time horse breeding.

Tankersley purchased her first purebred Arabian when she was 19 and began her horse breeding operation, Al-Marah Arabians in Tucson, Arizona, in 1941. As she moved across the U.S. for her newspaper career, her horses and farm name went with her. She purchased her program's foundation sire, Indraff, in 1947, while living in Illinois. Upon her move to Washington, DC, her Al-Marah operation relocated to Montgomery County, Maryland, where by 1957 it was the largest Arabian farm in the United States. Tankersley returned to Tucson in the 1970s, where in addition to horse breeding, she created an apprenticeship program at Al-Marah to train young people for jobs in the horse industry. She set up a second horse operation, the Hat Ranch, near Flagstaff, Arizona. Over her career, she bred over 2,800 registered Arabians and was one of the largest importers of horses from the Crabbet Arabian Stud in England.

Tankersley was a patron of many charities. Upon her death from Parkinson's disease in 2013, she bequeathed her Tucson ranch to the University of Arizona and placed the Hat Ranch in a conservation trust. In her final years, she downsized her breeding operation to about 150 horses. Most remaining stock went to her son, Mark Miller, who moved the Al-Marah Arabian farm name and horse operation to his home base near Clermont, Florida.

== Background and personal life ==
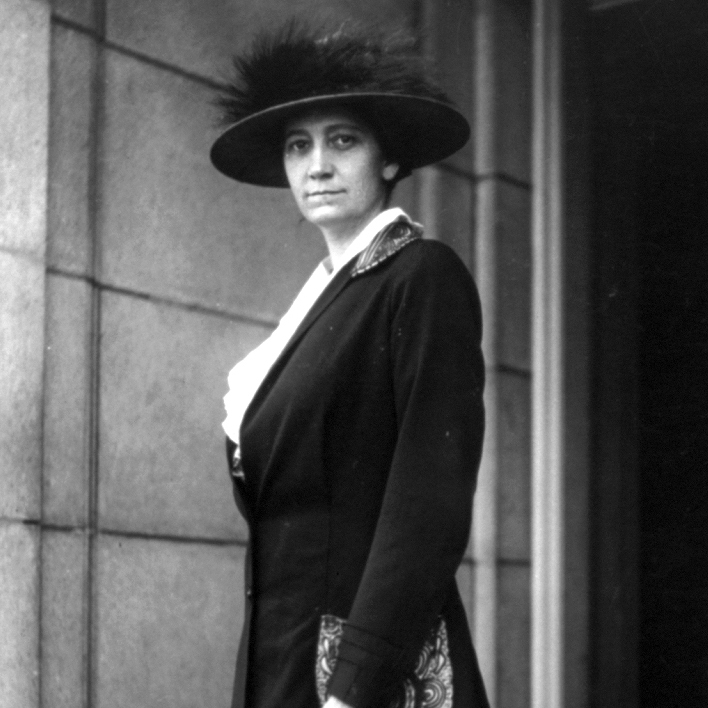
Ruth Hanna McCormick, 1920

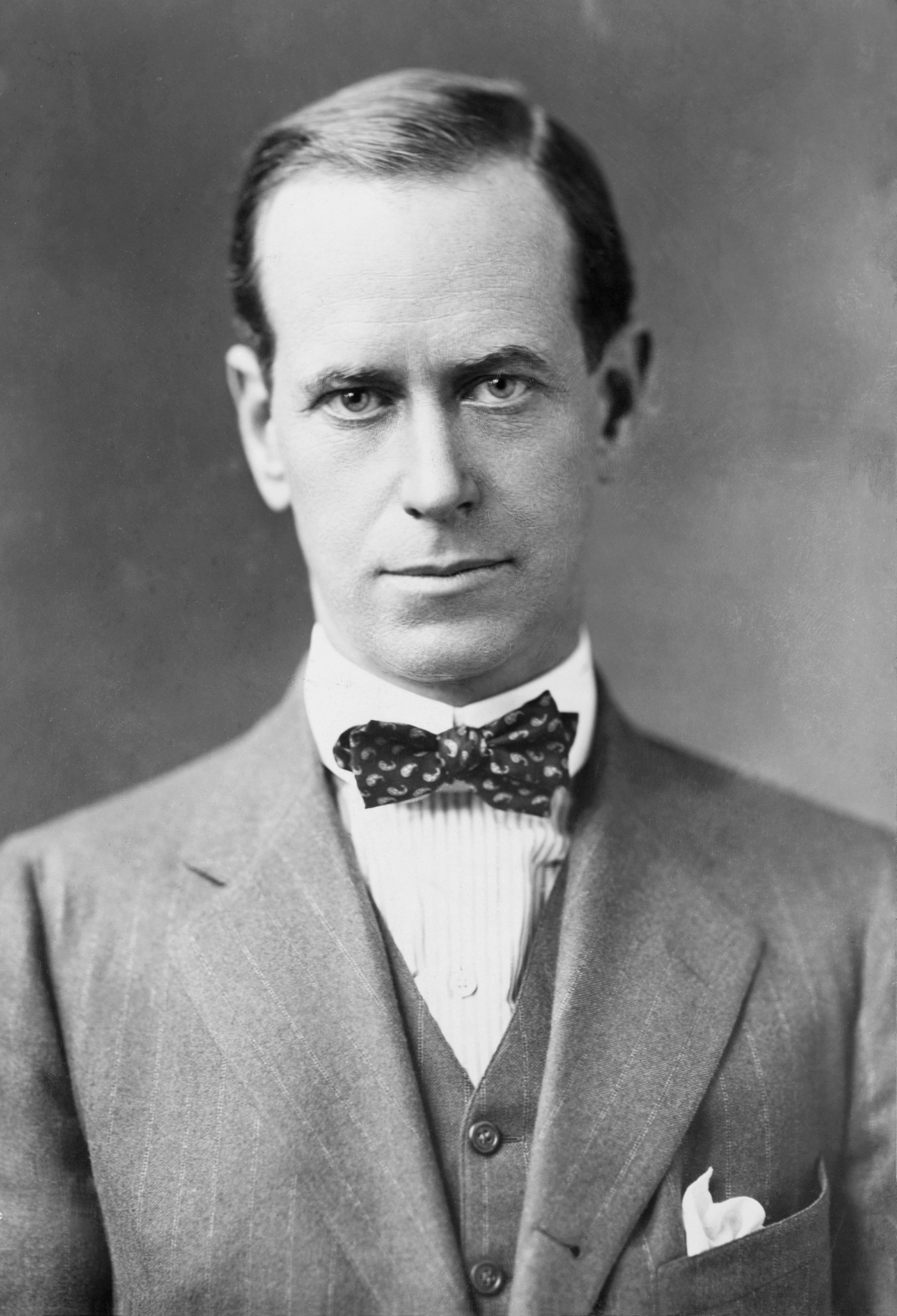
Joseph Medill McCormick, 1912

Tankersley was described as having "inherited a love of politics and horses, not necessarily in that order." She was born in Chicago, Illinois, on March 7, 1921. Her nickname "Bazy" came from how she pronounced the word "baby" when she was a toddler. Her father was Joseph Medill McCormick, part-owner of the Chicago Tribune and a Senator from Illinois. Her mother, Ruth Hanna McCormick was a daughter of Ohio Senator Mark Hanna was a member of the United States House of Representatives from Illinois, serving in the 71st Congress from 1929 to 1931 as a progressive Republican.

Tankersley was the youngest of three children, with an elder sister Katherine ("Katrina") and an elder brother John. When Tankersley was four, her father committed suicide, believed to be partly attributed to his defeat for renomination in 1924. Her mother remarried in 1932 to Albert Gallatin Simms, a lawyer, banker and congressman from New Mexico.

Tankersley spent part of her childhood on her mother's Rock River dairy farm in Byron, Illinois. She later moved to the Southwest with her mother and stepfather, living initially at a ranch owned by Simms in Albuquerque, New Mexico, then moving in 1937 to the Trinchera Ranch, a 250,000-acre (100,000 ha) property in Colorado that her mother had purchased. Tankersley attended a boarding school in Virginia and spent summers in the West. Her love of horses in general and the Arabian horse in particular came from those years: "Right away, my stepfather bought me a cow pony, and I wore it out ... So my mother got me a 3/4 Arabian that I couldn't wear out." She also showed horses on the East Coast in the 1930s. Her interest in Arabian horses led her to meeting several major breeders of the time, including Jimmie Dean of Traveler's Rest, Roger Selby, W. R. Brown and Carl Raswan.

Tankersley did not complete high school, and she later said "I virtually had no education." Nonetheless, she studied genetics at Vermont's Bennington College between 1939 and 1941 without completing a degree. While there, she gained some notoriety for genetic studies she conducted by raising fruit flies in her dorm room. In 2004, she was awarded an honorary doctorate in Humane Letters from the University of Arizona.

She married Maxwell Peter Miller, Jr. in 1941. She and Miller lived in Tucson for two years, where she developed a deep love for Arizona. They then moved to Chicago for a time, and subsequently to her mother's Trinchera Ranch, which Bazy ran. Her mother died of pancreatitis on December 31, 1944, two months after a serious riding accident.

The couple moved back to Illinois prior to relocating to Washington, DC. She divorced Miller in 1951 to marry Garvin E. "Tank" Tankersley, an editor at the Washington Times-Herald ten years older than she was. Garvin Tankersley had started his news career as a photographer, and he was the managing editor when he left the paper in 1952. The couple met while Bazy was running the Times-Herald, but Robert R. McCormick, Bazy's uncle and owner of the newspaper, considered Garvin Tankersley to be of unsuitable social status for Bazy because "Tank" was from a poor Lynchburg, Virginia, family. McCormick also disapproved of her divorce. Bazy saw the latter stance as hypocritical, given McCormick's own complicated personal life. McCormick's attempts to end the relationship ultimately prompted the couple to elope, and they were married for 45 years until Garvin's death in 1997.

Tankersley also dabbled in campaign politics. In 1948, she organized "Twenties for Taft" clubs to support the 1948 Presidential campaign of Robert A. Taft. She followed in the footsteps of her mother, who was the first woman to manage a presidential campaign, the 1940 and 1944 efforts of Thomas E. Dewey. Tankersley later described herself as a friend of Senator Joseph McCarthy, and in 1952, she advocated for the removal of Guy Gabrielson as chair of the Republican National Committee. Tankersley's politics shifted dramatically during her life. Noting her earlier strong affiliation with the Republican party and conservative politics, The Washington Post reported that in 2008 she voted for Barack Obama. She also supported Democratic Arizona Representative Gabby Giffords.

From her two marriages, Tankersley had three biological children – a son, Mark Miller (born 1947), and two daughters, Kristie Miller (born 1944) and Tiffany Tankersley (1970–2012). She also had two stepchildren, Anne Tankersley Sturm and Garvin Tankersley, Jr. At the time of her death, she had six grandchildren and two great-grandchildren.

== Newspaper career ==
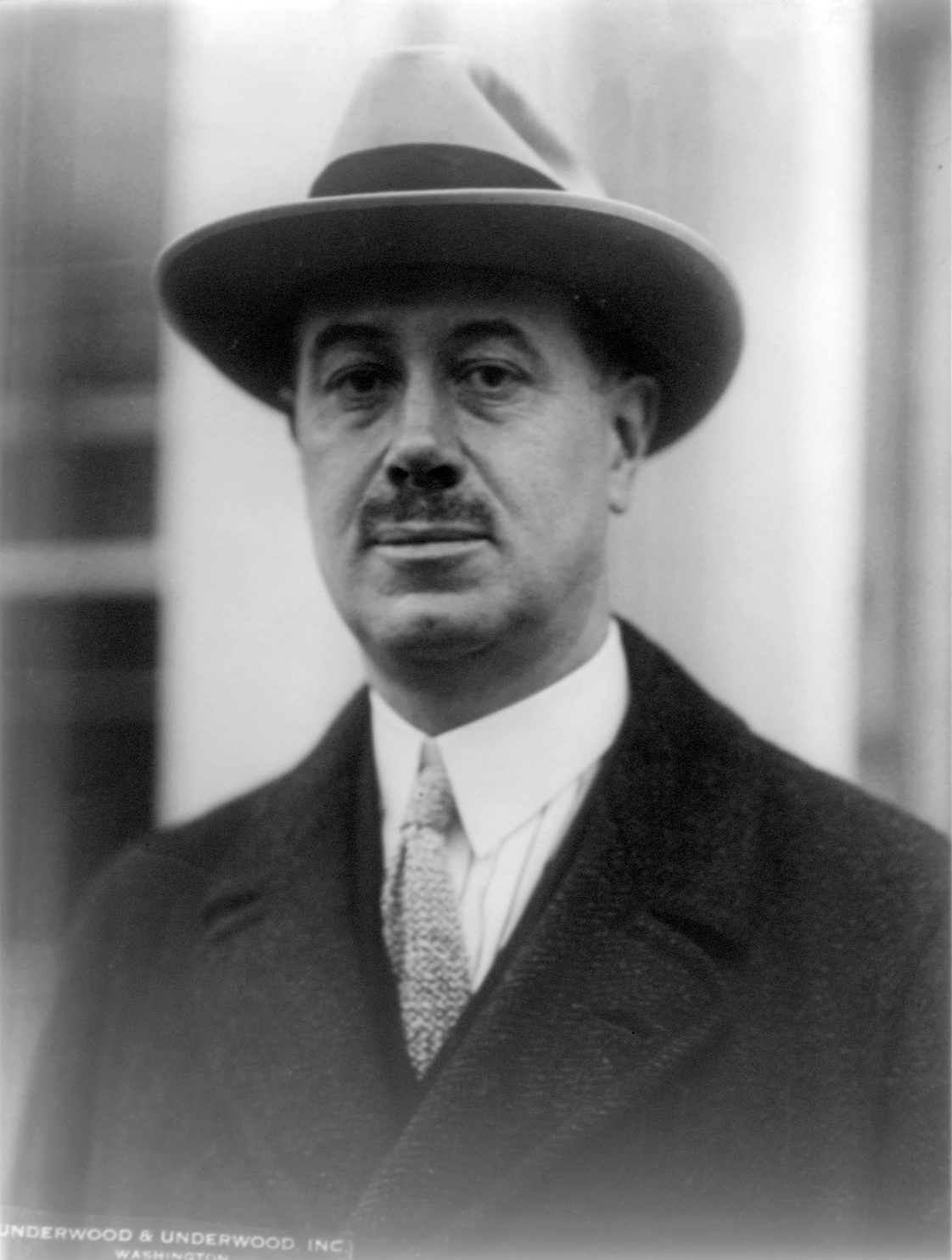
Robert R. McCormick, 1925

At 18, Tankersley (then Bazy McCormick) began working as a reporter for the Rockford Star, published by her mother. She gained experience running a newspaper in 1946 when she and Peter Miller purchased the LaSalle Post-Tribune in LaSalle, Illinois, and the Peru News-Herald, in Peru, Illinois, merging the papers to create the Daily News-Tribune. (Note: Now the News Tribune, still in the Miller family, serving LaSalle, Peru, and Ottawa, Illinois.) In 1949, her uncle, "Colonel" Robert R. McCormick, appointed her as the publisher of the family-owned Washington Times-Herald, an "isolationist and archconservative" paper known for sensationalism. McCormick had purchased it following the 1948 death of Eleanor Medill "Cissy" Patterson, his first cousin, and wanted Bazy to use the paper to create "an outpost of American principles". Robert McCormick had no children of his own, and "doted" on Bazy. He considered her the heir to his newspaper company. Tankersley was 28 at the time and was given the title of Vice-President.

During Tankersley's tenure as publisher of the Times-Herald, the paper was embroiled in two controversies related to McCarthy, one involving attacks intended to help unseat Democratic Senator Millard E. Tydings in 1950, and the other a lawsuit brought by Drew Pearson in 1951 over what Pearson viewed as a "conspiracy to smear his reputation". In the Tydings case, a composite photograph created by Garvin Tankersley made Tydings appear to be meeting with a communist party leader and was a factor in Tydings losing his race. It also brought Bazy and her paper to the attention of the United States Senate, where the paper's treatment of Tydings was viewed by a bipartisan Senate panel as a violation of "simple decency and honesty" and "a shocking abuse of the spirit and intent of the First Amendment of the Constitution". The Pearson lawsuit was a $5.1 million cause he filed against multiple defendants, including McCarthy and the Times-Herald, Westbrook Pegler and Fulton Lewis, alleging they had "contrived ... to hold plaintiff up to public scorn and ridicule". Pearson had frequently criticized McCarthy, McCarthy in turn criticized Pearson in a speech on the floor of the Senate, and the two men had even been in a physical altercation in December 1950. (Note: McCarthy kicked Pearson in the groin at a party, the attack was another count in Pearson's lawsuit) The Times-Herald was involved because the paper ran articles critical of Pearson and in one case described Pearson as a "New Deal communist", though it was asserted to have been a typographical error that should have read "columnist".

Bazy (then Miller) was publisher of the newspaper for only 19 months. By April 1951, McCormick and his niece developed differences of opinions over both the newspaper and her relationship with Garvin Tankersley. She later said, "I understood when I went to the Times-Herald I was to have full control. That control was not given me ... There is some difference in our political beliefs. I have broader Republican views than [McCormick] has. I am for the same people as the colonel, but I am for some more people." McCormick also told her to decide between Garvin Tankersley and the Tribune Company. As a result, she resigned from the Times-Herald. McCormick tried to run the paper himself, but lost money on the venture, and sold the Times-Herald to The Washington Post in 1954. When he announced the sale, one of the paper's board members insisted that Bazy Tankersley be given a chance to purchase it, so McCormick gave her 48 hours to match the $10 million asking price. She could not raise the money to do so. Upon the purchase of the Times-Herald, the Post consolidated its market position by discontinuing the rival paper. Though estranged for many years, Bazy and McCormick reconciled prior to his death.

After the sale, she continued to write a newspaper column for the Post, but also turned her attention to raising Arabian horses as a full-time occupation.

== Horse breeding career ==
In her 70-year career as a horse breeder, Tankersley emphasized athleticism and disposition in her Arabians. She is recorded as the breeder of over 2,800 registered Arabian foals in her lifetime, making her possibly the largest Arabian horse breeder in the world. At 19, she purchased her first Arabian horse, a mare named Curfa, (Note: Curfa was of straight Crabbet breeding and produced two foals while in Bazy's ownership.) using money from the sale of another horse she had ridden while at boarding school in Virginia. She founded the Al-Marah Arabian Horse Farm in 1941 on a 40-acre (16 ha) property when she first lived in Tucson. Mark Miller stated that the name Al-Marah was selected by Carl Raswan, who said it was Arabic for "a verdant garden oasis".

Throughout her newspaper career, she moved the Al-Marah farm name with her, to Illinois from 1944 to 1949, and outside of Washington, DC, in Maryland, where she lived from 1949 to 1975. Thereafter, she returned to Tucson permanently. She consistently used bloodlines from the Crabbet Arabian Stud, both via horses descended from early American importations as well as her own purchases from the estate of Lady Wentworth in the late 1950s. This unbroken line gives rise to Miller's assertion that the Al-Marah herd is the "oldest continuously-bred, privately-owned band of Arabians in the world".

=== Illinois ===
Indraff, ridden by Bazy Tankersley. Illinois, late 1940s

While she lived in Illinois, in 1947 Tankersley purchased a stallion named Indraff for $10,000. Indraff was bred by Roger Selby of Ohio, and was a son of the Crabbet-bred stallion *Raffles. (Note: An asterisk before the name of an Arabian horse indicates that the horse was imported to the United States.) Indraff became her foundation herd sire, and sired 254 purebred Arabians over his lifetime. Tankersley's first foundation mare, Selfra, was also of Crabbet bloodlines. By the time she left Illinois in 1949, Tankersley owned 45 Arabians.

=== Maryland ===
Upon arrival in the Washington, DC, area, Tankersley recreated Al-Marah Arabians in Montgomery County, near Washington. The Al-Marah property in Potomac, Maryland, consisted of 1,500 acres (610 ha), and for a time the Tankersleys also raised cattle there. The farm later moved to Barnesville, Maryland. Al-Marah was not only a horse breeding facility; the Tankersleys also hosted a number of political and social events. By 1957, Al-Marah was the largest Arabian horse farm in the United States. In that year, Lady Wentworth, owner of the Crabbet Arabian Stud, died and a number of horses were made available for sale. Tankersley bought 32 horses, the largest importation of Crabbet bloodstock to the United States in history. Lady Gladys Yule of the Hanstead Stud died within a few weeks of Lady Wentworth, and more top-quality Arabians bred in the UK were put on the market. Tankersley purchased 14 Hanstead horses, the largest group from that estate sold to a single buyer. The arrival of the English horses was, in Tankersley's view, an opportunity to preserve the core bloodlines tracing back to the horses originally gathered by Abbas Pasha.

Following these importations, Tankersley began to build her breeding program around two Crabbet sire lines, which she called the Double R cross. The first "R" stallion bloodline was that of *Raffles via his son Indraff, and the other "R" bloodline was that of Rissalix, a Crabbet-bred stallion owned by Hanstead, and sire of three Crabbet mares Tankersley imported. The two stallion lines shared a common female line to Rissla; she was the maternal granddam of Raffles and dam of Rissalix. In 1958, Tankersley added to her Double R program when she leased and imported the Rissalix son *Count Dorsaz, a Hanstead-bred horse. She owned him outright by 1959. She later added another Rissalix son from Hanstead, *Ranix. In 1962, she imported another Crabbet-bred stallion, *Silver Vanity. She used her knowledge of genetics to institute a program of selectively inbreeding horses of bloodlines she considered of excellent quality. In her early years, she also looked for "golden crosses", (Note: "Golden cross" refers to a combination of bloodlines that produce exceptional animals.) such as breeding offspring of Indraff to progeny of the Maynesboro-bred stallion Gulastra.

=== Arizona ===
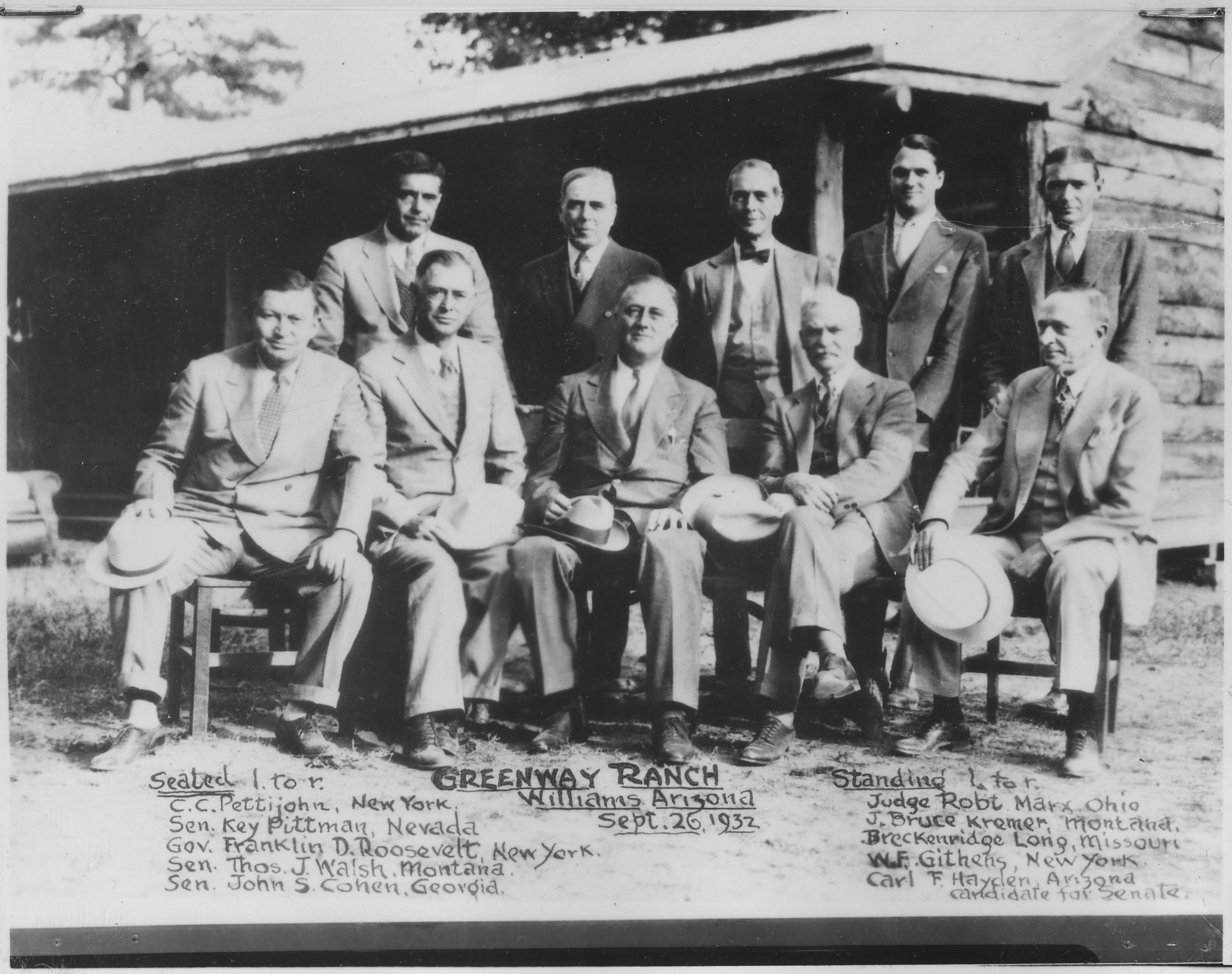
Franklin Delano Roosevelt, 1932 at the ranch later purchased by Tankersley

While living in the east, Tankersley missed Arizona and wanted to return. "I would read Arizona Highways and cry," she said. The Tankersleys moved back to Tucson and settled there permanently in 1975. She designed many of the buildings on her Tucson property herself. She added new stallions to her herd starting with Dreamazon in the 1980s, followed by a *Silver Vanity descendant, SDA Silver Legend, in 2001. In the 2000s, continuing her pattern of seeking "golden crosses", she imported the stallion *Bremervale Andronicus from Australia, an outcross for her intensely Crabbet-based bloodlines. He became the 2006 National Champion Arabian Sport Horse, and the reserve champion was AM Power Raid, a stallion from within her program.

Ultimately Tankersley operated two facilities in Arizona, her Al-Marah Arabian Farm, a 110-acre (45 ha) facility, and the Hat Ranch in Williams, near Flagstaff. The Hat Ranch property she purchased was the former Quarter Circle Double X Ranch and had been owned by Isabella Greenway, who had hosted Eleanor and Franklin Delano Roosevelt there. Tankersley, though identified as a Republican, displayed a photo of FDR at the ranch. The Hat Ranch was home to her young stock, allowing them to live free in an open range setting for two years before beginning training. It also served as the location for an annual think tank meeting for leaders of the Arabian Horse Association. The ranch also hosted the Straw Bale Forums where politicians, conservation leaders and academics could meet and discuss major issues. In 2003, Tankersley was given the Arabian Breeder's Association Lifetime Breeder's Award.

=== Apprenticeship program ===
In 1973, Tankersley created an apprenticeship program to train people both for work as employees at her ranch and for positions elsewhere in the horse industry. It grew into an intensive two-year course that covered all aspects of the horse industry, provided participants college credit through Pima Community College, and was licensed by the US Department of Labor. She also donated horses to an Arabian breeding program at Michigan State University. Tankersley was noted throughout her career for her support of youth involvement with Arabian horses.

=== Death and bequests ===
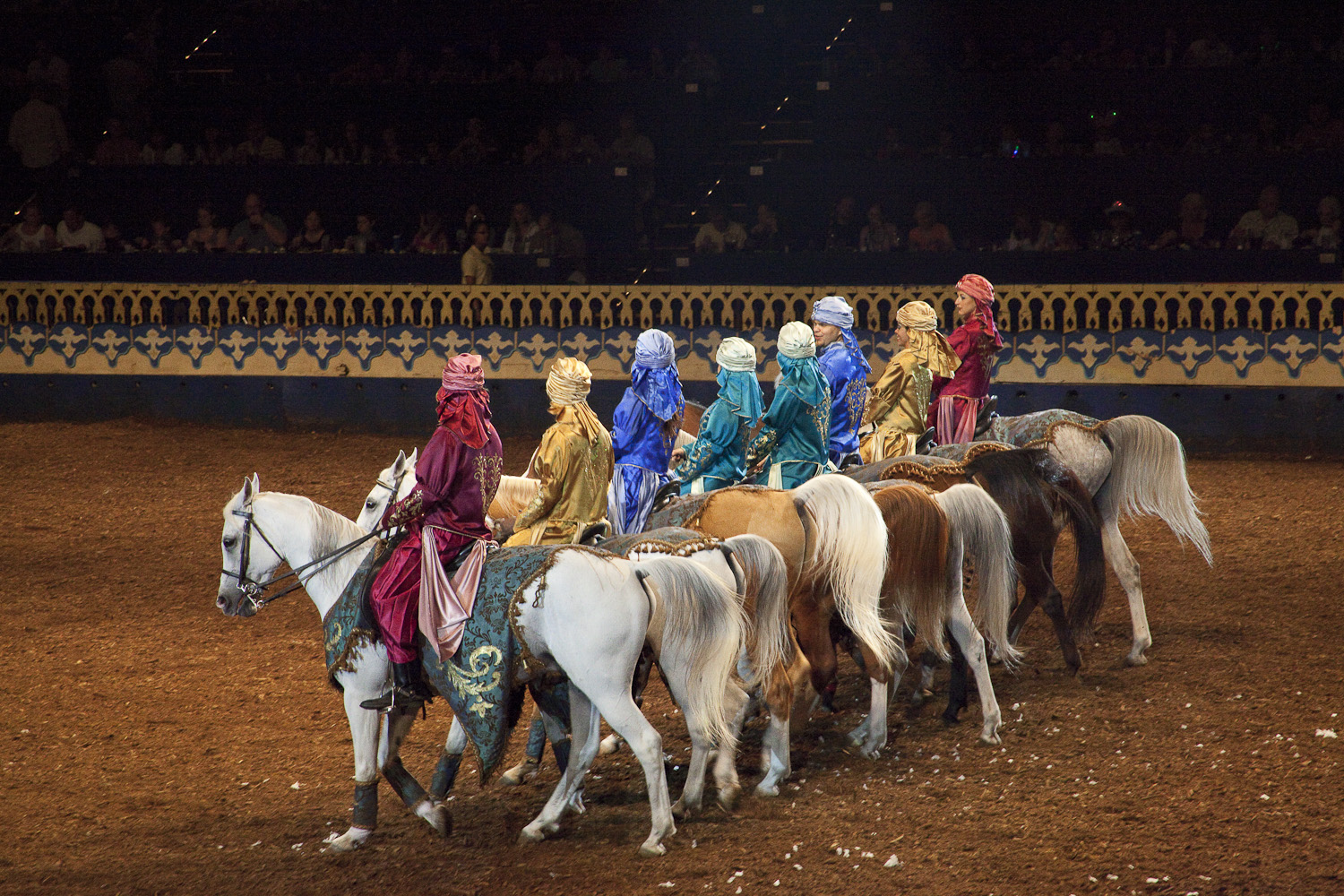
Al-Marah horses featured at Miller's Arabian Nights dinner show, 2010

Tankersley died on February 5, 2013. She had Parkinson's disease. As she aged, Tankersley downsized her horse breeding operation from 350 horses to under 150 just prior to her death. Upon her death, her son, Mark Miller inherited many of her remaining horses. Miller had run an entertainment venue called Arabian Nights, in Kissimmee, Florida, near Disney World, from 1988 until 2013. There, he used Al-Marah-bred horses to present a 90-minute dinner show performance every night of the year that featured 50 Arabian horses. He closed that program in December 2013 so that he could focus on the Al-Marah horses. He moved the farm name and the breeding operation to his home base near Clermont, Florida.

The Tucson Al-Marah Ranch, consisting of 85 acres (34 ha) with an estimated worth of $30 million, was donated to the University of Arizona's College of Agriculture as a working ranch. The Hat Ranch had a conservation easement with rights to more than 1,500 acres (610 ha) given to the Grand Canyon Trust to prevent further development. Tankersley's longtime employee, Jerry Hamilton, continued to manage the Hat Ranch for Miller as a home for young horses bred by Al-Marah.

== Legacy ==
Tankersley once stated, "I come from that old-fashioned background of noblesse oblige: If you're born with money, you have an obligation to do good works for others." She was also noted for a strong personality, as her friend, Hermann Bleibtreu of the University of Arizona explained: "If she was in any position of leadership or power, she was dominant." She became a strong environmentalist, donating to conservation, environmental, and aquaculture research. She supported renewable energy, smart growth, and water conservation, and promoted reform of state land management. She also helped Defenders of Wildlife preserve the Aravaipa Canyon. Carl Hodges, of the University of Arizona's Environmental Research Lab, stated, "she was as fine and intellectually competent an environmentalist as anybody I'd ever known."

Her financial support also went to charities for disabled children and assorted cultural activities. While in Maryland, she was involved in the creation of two private schools, the Primary Day School in Bethesda and the Barnesville School. In Tucson in 1980 she founded the St. Gregory College Preparatory School, now called The Gregory School.

Tankersley was a consistent advocate of the Arabian breed as a performance horse. In addition to the show ring and endurance riding, where she sometimes rode her own horses, she also tested her horses on the race track. In endurance, a horse she bred, Al Marah Xanthium, won the Tevis Cup. Many others earned national championships in the show ring over the course of her career. She was a major promoter of the Arabian Horse Association Sport Horse Nationals, and her horses acquired many championships at that competition. Further supporting Tankersley's interest in sport horse disciplines, two of her horses, Al Marah Xanthium and Al-Marah Quebec, were the first Arabians accepted into the American Trakehner Registry.

Tankersley founded the Arabian Horse Owners Foundation (AHOF) in 1963 as a charity to fund the needs of the Arabian horse community. At the time of her death in 2013, the foundation had helped create the Arabian section of the International Museum of the Horse at the Kentucky Horse Park in Lexington, Kentucky: the Al-Marah Arabian Horse Galleries. Housed there are the collections of the AHOF and the Arabian Horse Trust. During the 2010 World Equestrian Games, which were held at the Kentucky Horse Park, the foundation sponsored and funded the exhibit "Gift of the Desert: The Art, History and Culture of the Arabian Horse", bringing publicity to the Arabian breed during a major international equestrian competition.

== Sources ==
- Ahneman-Rudsenske, Faye; Susan Bavaria (Spring 2013). "Grande Dame of the Arabian Horse". Modern Arabian Horse: 60–67.
- Edwards, Gladys Brown. (1973). The Arabian: War Horse to Show Horse (Revised Collector's ed.). Covina, California: Rich Publishing, Inc. OCLC 1148763.
- Miller, Kristie (2005). Isabella Greenway: An Enterprising Woman. Tucson, Arizona: University of Arizona Press. ISBN 9780816525188.
- Schofler, Patti (2006). Flight Without Wings: The Arabian Horse and the Show World. Guilford, Connecticut: Lyons Press/Globe Pequot. ISBN 1-59228-800-6.
- Smith, Richard Norton (2003). The Colonel : the life and legend of Robert R. McCormick, 1880–1955. Evanston, Illinois: Northwestern University Press. ISBN 9780810120396.
