= Thomas Catto, 1st Baron Catto =

Scottish businessman and banker (1879–1959)

The Right Honourable The Lord Catto CBE PC

Governor of the Bank of England
- In office 1944–1949
- Preceded by: Sir Montagu Collet Norman
- Succeeded by: Cameron Cobbold

Member of the House of Lords Lord Temporal
- In office 25 February 1936 – 23 August 1959; Hereditary Peerage
- Preceded by: Peerage created
- Succeeded by: Stephen Catto, 2nd Baron Catto

Personal details
- Born: Thomas Sivewright Catto; 15 March 1879 Newcastle upon Tyne, England
- Died: 23 August 1959 (aged 80) Holmbury St Mary, Surrey, England
- Profession: Merchant, banker

Thomas Sivewright Catto, 1st Baron Catto, CBE, PC (15 March 1879 – 23 August 1959) was a Scottish businessman and later Governor of the Bank of England.

== Early life and education ==
Catto was born in Newcastle upon Tyne, to William and Isabella Catto. His father, a shipwright, had moved to Newcastle to find work, but died less than a year after Thomas was born and the family returned to their hometown of Peterhead, Aberdeenshire. They later moved back to Newcastle and Catto won a scholarship to Heaton School (later Rutherford College of Technology).

== Shipping ==
At the age of fifteen, Catto joined the Gordon Steam Shipping Company as a clerk. In 1898 he became secretary to William Horwood Stuart, managing partner of F. A. Mattievich & Co, based in Batumi and Baku, Russia.

In 1904 he was offered the management of the new London office of MacAndrews & Forbes, an American firm with interests in the East, one of whose partners was David Forbes, a fellow Scot with whom he had become friendly in Baku. Catto became a member of the Baltic Exchange. In 1906 he went to Smyrna as Forbes's deputy and travelled extensively in the Near East and Middle East. In 1909 he became a vice-president of the company at their New York office.

== First World War ==
Too short to serve in the armed forces during the First World War, he instead became involved in the transport of supplies to Russia and then served as the British Admiralty representative on the Russian Commission to the United States from 1915 to 1917. From 1917 to 1918 he served on the British Food Mission in the United States and in 1918 he was appointed chairman of the Allied Provisions Commission and head of the British Ministry of Food in North America.

== Inter-war years ==
He did not return to McAndrews & Forbes after the war; instead, in 1919, he became chairman of the vast Andrew Yule and Company Ltd. of Calcutta, succeeding Sir David Yule. This is now a private company 93.26% owned by the Government of India. Catto and Yule also formed Yule Catto & Company Ltd, which is now known as Synthomer and is listed on the London Stock Exchange.

In 1928 he returned to London as a partner in the investment bank Morgan, Grenfell & Co., remaining chairman of Andrew Yule & Co and Yule Catto & Co until 1940.

== Second World War and later life ==
In April 1940 he was appointed Director-General of Equipment and Stores at the Ministry of Supply and a Director of the Bank of England. In July 1941 he moved to become Financial Adviser to the Treasury. In April 1944 he was elected Governor of the Bank of England and served until February 1949, and overseeing the nationalisation of the bank.

He suffered from Parkinson's disease and died in Holmbury St Mary, Surrey in 1959. His son Stephen succeeded to his title.

== Honours ==
For his services in the First World War, Catto was appointed Commander of the Order of the British Empire (CBE) in 1918 and created a baronet in the 1921 Birthday Honours. He was created Baron Catto, of Cairncatto, in 1936 and appointed to the Privy Council in 1947.

== Arms ==
Coat of arms of Thomas Catto, 1st Baron Catto
Crest A wild cat sejant Proper resting the dexter paw on a garb Or. Escutcheon Or on a chevron between three lymphads Sable as many boars' heads couped of the field. Supporters On either side a tiger Proper charged on the shoulder with an ivy leaf Or. Motto Touch Not Gloveless

== Footnotes ==
Government offices
Preceded by Sir Mongagu Collet Norman	Governor of the Bank of England; 1944–1949	Succeeded by Cameron Cobbold
Peerage of the United Kingdom
New creation	Baron Catto; 1936–1959	Succeeded by Stephen Gordon Catto
Baronetage of the United Kingdom
New creation	Baronet (of Cairncatto); 1921–1959	Succeeded by Stephen Gordon Catto
