= Sir David Yule, 1st Baronet =

Scottish businessman (1858–1928)

Sir David Yule, 1st Baronet (4 August 1858 – 3 July 1928) was a Scottish businessman based in British India. The Oxford Dictionary of National Biography judged him "arguably the most important businessman in India" and quoted his obituary in The Times as "one of the wealthiest men, if not the wealthiest man, in the country".

== Early life ==
David was born in Edinburgh, the son of David Yule and his wife Margaret. His father was a writer who also worked as a cashier at the Sasine Office, Register House. David was educated in Britain and went into the family business, which was trade with India, then the "jewel in the crown" of the British Empire.

== Career ==
David Yule joined Andrew Yule and Company, a conglomerate with diversified interests, which was founded by both his uncles, Andrew Yule and George Yule. The principal business of the company was the export of jute fiber. Over time the Yules became progressively integrated in India from plantation to textile mills.

His uncle George died childless in 1892. His uncle Andrew had a daughter, Annie Henrietta, whom David married in 1900. Andrew died in 1902 and at this point, the entire Yule conglomerate came under David's control.

In 1919, David Yule and Thomas Catto, 1st Baron Catto formed Yule Catto and Company Ltd, which is now known as Synthomer and is listed on the London Stock Exchange. Among his other business interests were directorships of Midland Bank, Mercantile Bank of India, Vickers Limited, the Royal Exchange Assurance Company and ownership of the Daily Chronicle newspaper, which he purchased from Lloyd George.

David Yule was knighted by King George V in India on 4 January 1912 and was created a baronet, of Hugli River in Calcutta, on 30 January 1922. He died on 3 July 1928. His baronetcy lapsed at his death for lack of an eligible heir.

The New York Times reported that his wife inherited $100,000,000 on his death, equivalent to $1.6 billion in 2022 money.

== Personal life ==
David and Annie Yule had one child, a daughter, Gladys Yule (1903–1957). In 1925, the two women commissioned, as their family home, Hanstead House in Bricket Wood, Hertfordshire. Here, they set up a very successful horse breeding farm for the Arabian breed, known as the Hanstead Stud. Annie Yule also commissioned one of the largest private yachts ever built in the UK, Nahlin, which measured 1,574 tons Thames measurement, was 300 feet (91 m) long and was said to have cost £250,000.

Descendants of the Yule family are still alive today in England.

Baronetage of the United Kingdom
New creation	Baronet (of Hugli River); 1922–1928	Extinct
