= Animal Health Trust =

UK charity

- Founded: 1942
- Founder: WR Wooldridge CBE, FRCVS
- Dissolved: 31 July 2020
- Type: Charitable organisation
- Purpose: Epizootiology; Horses; Canine; Feline
- Location: Lanwades Park, Kentford, Newmarket
- Origins: Veterinary Education Trust by Walter Reginald Wooldridge
- Region served: Veterinary medicine
- Key people: Peter Webbon (CEO); Andrew Higgins (veterinarian)Scientific Director and Chief Executive

The Animal Health Trust (AHT) was a large national independent charity in the United Kingdom, employing 200 scientists, veterinarians and support workers. Its objectives were to study and cure diseases in pets (horses, dogs and cats), and research and postgraduate education in veterinary medicine. It was founded in 1942 by WR Wooldridge, and was awarded a Royal Charter on 29 July 1963. Elizabeth II was the charity's patron from 1959 until the end of 2016, and the Princess Royal was its president. Based in Newmarket in Suffolk, it was a registered charity under English law and received no government funding. Following fundraising issues exacerbated by the COVID-19 pandemic, the charity entered liquidation on 31 July 2020.

== Work ==
Research of the AHT was in two main areas: inherited disease and infectious disease. Inherited disease research includes genetics, oncology and stem cell research. Infectious disease includes bacteriology, virology, immunology and equine epidemiology and disease surveillance. Its clinics ran active internship and residency training programs for postgraduate education and training. The AHT published research and clinical findings in journals such as Nature, and it also had its own open-access library.

AHT had two clinical centres: the Centre for Small Animal Studies and Centre for Equine Studies. Both clinics offered diagnostic laboratories and DNA testing services and conducted research.

== History ==
The AHT was founded in 1942 as the Veterinary Education Trust by Walter Reginald Wooldridge; it was renamed the "Animal Health Trust" in 1948. One of its first major donors was Annie Henrietta Yule, co-owner of Hanstead Stud, who offered the Trust the use of her Newmarket stable, Balaton Lodge. The Trust operated from there until 1998.

The Animal Health Trust expanded quickly after 1942 with schemes for postgraduate veterinary education and the establishment of four research centres for the diagnosis, treatment and prevention of diseases in horses, dogs, farm livestock and poultry, making a considerable contribution to veterinary science that was considered a monument to Wooldridge; Following the death of Wooldridge in 1966, the Trust focussed its work on horses and small animals, and in 1998 consolidated all of its activities at Lanwades Park near Newmarket.

In 1989 the Trust received a grant of arms with the motto Salus Fidesque Animalium (the health and trust of animals).

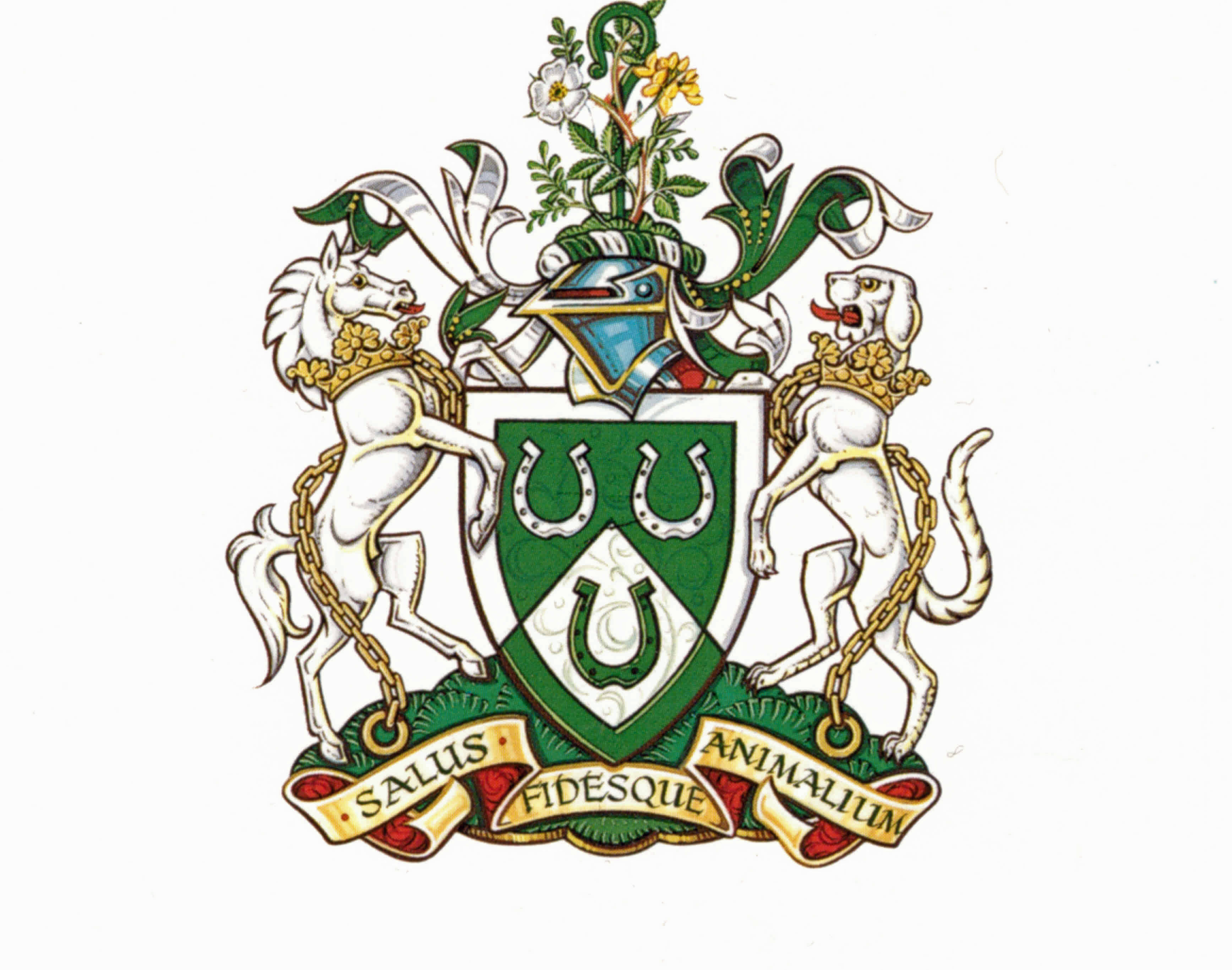
Animal Health Trust Coat of Arms

Lord Kirkham, who was on the Board of Trustees of AHT for 30 years (1990-2020) and served as Member of Council, Chair of the Executive Committee, and Vice-President, was a major donor to the charity. In the 1996 New Year Honours he was given a knighthood for his charitable work for the AHT and The Duke of Edinburgh's Award.

Following fundraising difficulties and issues aggravated by the COVID-19 pandemic, the Animal Health Trust entered liquidation on 31 July 2020 with an auction for medical equipment in August 2020. The medical site of the AHT went on auction for £7.85 million. Lord Kirkham funded the relocation of the Harris Library to the Harper Keele Veterinary School, and the transfer of the institute's archives to the Royal College of Veterinary Surgeons.
