= George Yule (businessman) =

Scottish merchant in England and India

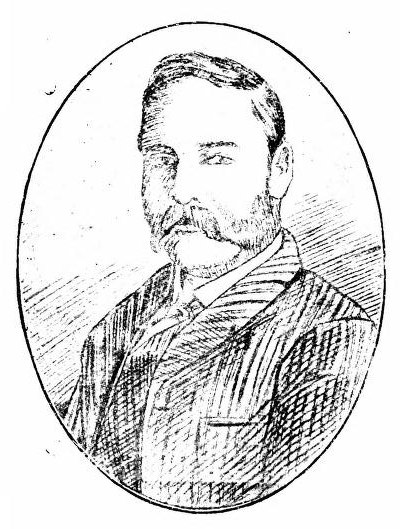

George Yule (17 April 1829 – 26 March 1892) was a Scottish merchant in England and India who served as the fourth President of the Indian National Congress in 1888 at Allahabad, the first non-Indian to hold that office. He was the founder of George Yule & Co. of London (now Synthomer, a FTSE 250 company), and headed Andrew Yule & Co., of Calcutta. He served as Sheriff of Calcutta and President of Bengal Chamber of Commerce.

He killed almost 400 tigers during his tenure as Administrator.

== Merchant in England and India ==
Around 1855 George Yule and his brother Andrew Yule moved to Manchester and in 1858 they established a warehouse partnership there. The business flourished, enabling George Yule to reside at Platt Hall, Manchester, and at 22A Austin Friars (near the Bank of England in the City of London), while his brother moved to India. In 1875 George Yule, accompanied by their nephew David Yule (son of the third brother, David), joined Andrew in India. George, who was childless, served as the principal director of the various family enterprises. Andrew's daughter Annie married her cousin David and the wealth was consolidated over the generations.

George Yule is interred at Dunnottar kirkyard.
