= Synthomer =

British chemical manufacturing company

Synthomer plc
- Company type: Public
- Traded as: LSE: SYNT
- Industry: Chemicals
- Founded: 1863
- Headquarters: London, England
- Key people: Caroline Johnstone (Chair); Michael Willome (CEO)
- Revenue: ▼£1,739.2 million (2025)
- Operating income: ▼£37.6 million (2025)
- Net income: ▼£ (150.1) million (2025)
- Number of employees: 3,900 (2026)
- Website: www.synthomer.com

Synthomer plc, formerly known as Yule Catto & Co, is a British-based chemicals business. It is listed on the London Stock Exchange.

== History ==
The company traces its roots back to 1863, when Andrew Yule founded a trading house known as Andrew Yule & Co. in Calcutta. At the same time Andrew's brother, George Yule, set up George Yule & Co. in London, which acted as British agency arm of Andrew Yule & Co.

When in 1919 Andrew Yule & Co. and George Yule & Co. were sold to the US banking group J.P. Morgan & Co. and its British merchant banking affiliate Morgan Grenfell & Co., both were turned from a partnership into a private limited company. That same year Thomas Catto (1879–1959) was sent to India to take over management of the firm from Sir David Yule (1858–1928), a nephew of Andrew Yule. David Yule continued to hold the title of Chairman but had no active part in the operations of the business.

In 1920, Thomas Catto and David Yule changed the name of the British purchasing arm of Andrew Yule & Co., George Yule and Company, to Yule, Catto & Company Ltd. Due to increased taxation, the devaluation of the Indian rupee and the abolition of the managing agency system, Yule, Catto & Co. decided in 1969 to sell its shareholding in Andrew Yule & Co. to the Indian government.

With the acquisition of Revertex Chemicals in 1980, Thomas Catto's son, Stephen (1923–2001) started to turn Yule Catto & Co. into an international speciality chemicals and building products manufacturer. Since 2007 the group has been transformed from a diversified chemical business to a focussed speciality polymer business. In 2012 the company changed its name to Synthomer on the basis that the majority of its business already traded under that name.

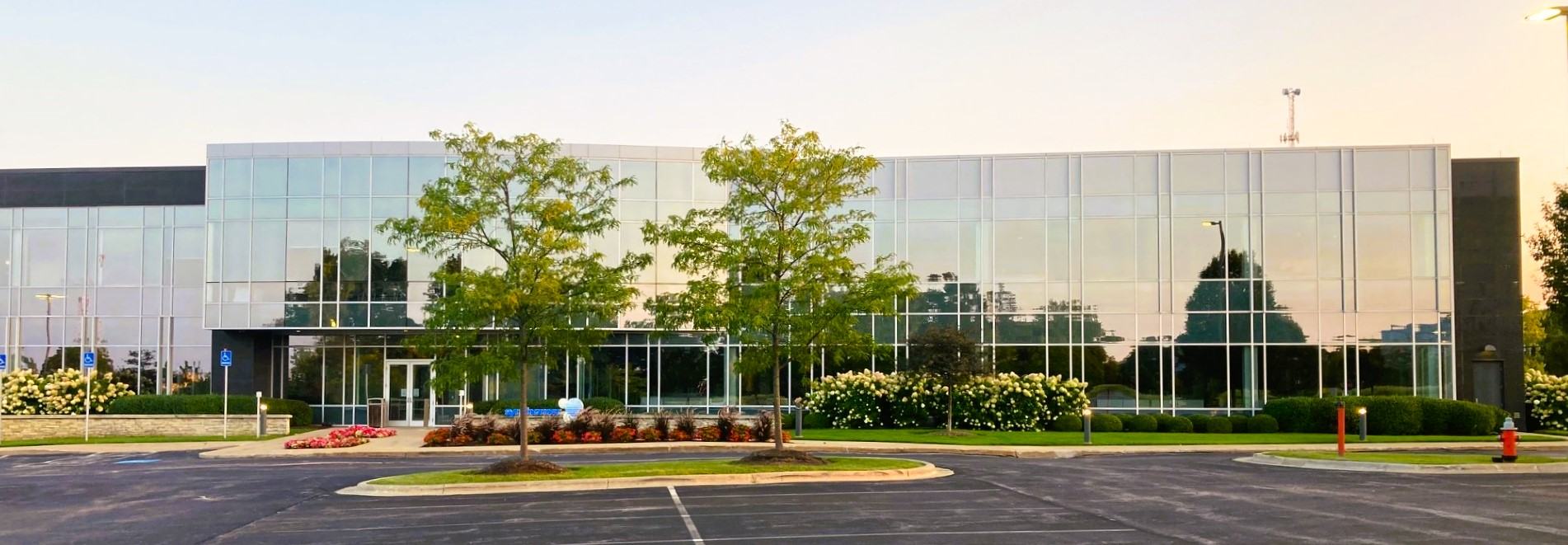
Synthomer building in Beachwood, Ohio. Formerly OMNOVA

In July 2019, Synthomer announced that it was going to buy OMNOVA Solutions for an enterprise value of $824 million; the transaction was completed on 2 April 2020.

In October 2021, Synthomer announced the acquisition of Eastman Chemical adhesive activities for $1 billion. It included a former Hercules factory with 230 employees in Middelburg, the Netherlands, that produced about 80 different synthetic resins. They delivered, partly in 20 tonne bulk, to companies in over 70 countries.

== Operations ==
The company has three activities: polymer chemicals, pharma chemicals and impact chemicals.

== Sources ==
- Jones, Geoffrey (2007). Merchants to Multinationals. Oxford University Press. ISBN 978-0-19-829450-4.
