= Hanstead Stud =

English horse breeding farm

Coordinates: 51°42′15″N 0°20′49″W

The Hanstead Stud was a breeding farm in England for Arabian horses. It was active from 1928 to 1957, and its animals had a significant impact in many countries, "second only in importance to" Crabbet Arabian Stud. It was based at Hanstead Park, a country house estate near St Albans in Hertfordshire, not far from London.

== Background and beginning ==
The business was started and run by a mother and daughter. Annie Henrietta Yule (1874-1950) came from a prosperous Anglo-Indian merchant family; in 1900 she married her cousin Sir David Yule (1858-1928), who had come out from Britain to join the family business in Calcutta. They had one child, Gladys Meryl (1903-1957). In 1925, they commissioned a new family home, Hanstead House, where Lady Yule and her daughter lived for the rest of their lives. Sir David died in 1928, leaving his widow and daughter extremely wealthy women; The New York Times reported that Gladys inherited $100 000 000, equivalent to $1.6 billion in 2022 money.

The women bred livestock (Aberdeen Angus and Jersey cattle) and horses, including Suffolk Punches (large draught horses, still used to work the land, until tractors became widespread) and Thoroughbreds (a breed used for fox hunting as well as flat racing and steeplechases). In 1925 they expanded their interests to the breeding of Arabian horses. That summer the pair visited Crabbet Arabian Stud, whose founders, husband and wife team Wilfrid Scawen Blunt and Lady Anne Blunt, had introduced the breed to England in 1878. (They too had a daughter as their only child, Judith Blunt-Lytton, usually known as Lady Wentworth.) This visit began a long relationship of buying and leasing horses; sometimes the studs were adversaries and sometimes partners.

== Significance in Britain and abroad ==
A 1997 article on "Hanstead Horses" begins with this overview:

"Next to Crabbet, no English stud has been as important as Hanstead. Hanstead’s worldwide influence is particularly remarkable in light of the relatively short time it was in operation — not even 35 years of breeding — and the relatively small number of foals produced. There were barely 125, while Crabbet had more than a thousand spread over 93 years."

A third stud, Courtlands, was also held up to be of the same level, and the three competed against each other at annual shows such as the one at the Roehampton Club.

International trade before and after World War II meant that the Hanstead horses were appreciated in countries such as the United States, South Africa, Australia, the Netherlands, and Canada. "In the post-war years Hanstead was a mature stud, with a band of 10 to 15 mares and a battery of homebred stallions."

Gladys took formal control of the stud in 1946; Annie Henrietta died in 1950, leaving her £9 million. Gladys "served as president of the Arab Horse Society in 1949. She was also chairman of the Ponies of Britain Club, helping to preserve Britain’s native pony breeds." By the time of her death at the age of 57, she was considered the best horsewoman in Britain, according to Richard Davenport-Hines in the Oxford Dictionary of National Biography. She never married, having been "fortune hunted" by a thousand suitors, but for the last years of her life she shared Hanstead House with her colleague and friend Patricia Wolf. Wolf, born circa 1914, had served during the War in the Auxiliary Territorial Service, the women's branch of the British Army. She joined the stud in 1952 as a stable girl, the bottom rung of the ladder, but "was quickly promoted to head groom, then stud manager, and finally, companion-secretary".

== Death and dissolution ==
Gladys Yule died within a few weeks of Lady Wentworth, who had inherited Crabbet from her parents and had run it for 40 years. The deaths of these two only children, at a time of high post-war inheritance tax, meant that in 1957 a substantial number of British-bred Arabian horses left the country, improving the breed's bloodlines elsewhere. About a dozen from each stud went to Bazy Tankersley’s Al-Marah Arabians in the United States. Patricia Wolf was bequeathed options on some of the horses, which she took up. She was also given £100 000 and all the pets.

Following the death of Gladys Yule in 1957, not only was the bloodstock dispersed, but the landed property was put up for sale. Hanstead Park remained on the market for a couple of years, as many country houses were being demolished at this time. Eventually it was sold to an American evangelist and was used as a college; when this closed, the estate became a corporate training centre. In 2011 the property again changed hands, this time to be developed as housing; the 1920s mansion has been converted to apartments There are still commercial stables operating from Hanstead, though as a livery yard and riding school rather than as a stud.
