= OMNOVA Solutions =

American chemical company

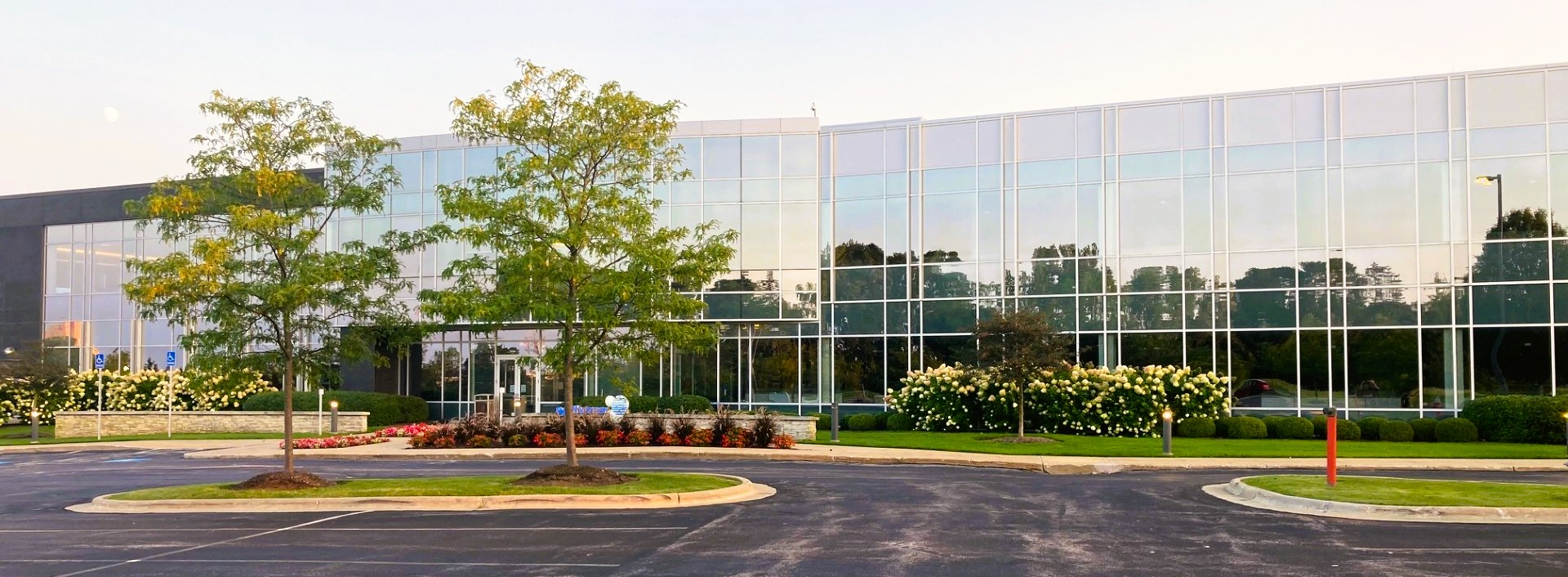
- Headquarters in Beachwood, Ohio.
- Type: Subsidiary
- Traded as: NYSE: OMN; Russell 2000 Component
- Industry: Specialty Chemicals
- Founded: 1999
- Headquarters: Beachwood, Ohio, U.S.
- Key people: Anne Noonan (President & CEO); Paul DeSantis (CFO)
- Products: Emulsion Polymers, Specialty Chemicals, and Decorative and Functional Surfaces
- Revenue: ▼US$759.9 million (FY 2016)
- Net income: ▲ -US$.4 million (FY 2016)
- Total assets: ▲US$693.2 million (FY 2016)
- Total equity: ▲US$109.8 million (FY 2016)
- Number of employees: 2,100
- Parent: Synthomer
- Website: www.omnova.com

OMNOVA Solutions, Inc. is a global manufacturer of laminates, performance films and coated fabrics. OMNOVA was founded in 1999 when GenCorp, Inc. spun off its Decorative & Building Products and Performance Chemicals businesses into a separate, publicly traded company. OMNOVA's world headquarters is located in Beachwood, Ohio; with additional sales, manufacturing and distribution locations throughout Europe and Asia.

== Products ==
OMNOVA produces a variety of products within two business units: Performance Chemicals and Engineered Surfaces. The Engineered Surfaces business operates the following divisions: Laminates, Coated Fabrics Upholstery, Performance Films, and Digitally Printed Wall Murals.

=== Performance Chemicals ===
According to OMNOVA's webpage, the Performance Chemicals business makes up about 75% of the company's revenue. Emulsion polymers and specialty chemicals are key ingredients in products for a wide variety of end uses including architectural and industrial coatings; nonwovens used in hygiene products, filtration and construction; drilling additives for oil and gas exploration and production; elastomeric modification of plastic casings and hoses used in household and industrial products and automobiles; floor polishes and sealers; tire cord and fabric reinforced rubber goods; molded rubber components; tapes and adhesives; sports surfaces; textile finishes; carpet backing; and coated paper and packaging.

The performance features of end use products that incorporate OMNOVA chemicals include stain, rust and aging resistance; surface modification; gloss; softness or hardness; dimensional stability; high heat and pressure tolerance; and binding and barrier (e.g. moisture, oil) properties.

=== Engineered Surfaces ===
OMNOVA's Engineered Surfaces business comprises the remaining 25% of the company's sales. Laminates, coated fabrics and films are primarily rolled goods (and occasionally sheets) of vinyl, polyurethane or paper. Superior durability, cleanability, stain and chip resistance, and design flexibility are hallmarks of these products. Additionally, the Engineered Surfaces Business Unit's products include viewnique digital wall murals which can be used to create branded interior for restaurants and retail chains.

=== Laminates ===
OMNOVA designs and manufactures decorative laminates for both residential and commercial interiors. OMNOVA's laminate portfolio includes realistic woodgrains, faux marbles and granites, and contemporary patterns and solids that are available in a variety of textures, colors, and surface decorative and protective finishes. Laminate materials range from paper to high-performance 3D thermofoil. OMNOVA's laminates are used to fabricate retail fixtures and displays, casework for hospitality and food service; kitchen and bath cabinetry; residential and commercial furniture; recreational vehicle and manufactured housing interiors; and luxury vinyl tile flooring.

=== Coated Fabrics Upholstery ===
OMNOVA's coated fabrics are primarily used in upholstered seating as a high performance alternative to textile upholsteries. Major and emerging automotive OEMs in Asia are increasingly depending on OMNOVA’s coated fabrics to upgrade the quality of their seating. Additionally, OMNOVA's vinyl and polyurethane upholstery is used across the global transportation sector in mass transit trains and buses, heavy duty trucks, and boats. OMNOVA's upholstery products are also used in various contract applications including healthcare, casinos, hospitality, and corporate offices.

=== Acquisition by Synthomer ===
On July 2, 2019, Synthomer announced that it was going to buy Omnova Solutions for an enterprise value of $824 million in a bid to strengthen its global position as heard from Reuters. The acquisition was completed on April 2, 2020.
