= Indraff =

- Indraff with Bazy Tankersley
- Breed: Arabian
- Sire: Raffles
- Grandsire: Skowronek (GSB)
- Dam: Indaia
- Maternal grandsire: Raseem
- Sex: Stallion
- Foaled: May 9, 1938
- Died: 1963 (aged 24–25)
- Country: United States
- Color: Gray
- Breeder: Roger Selby
- Owner: Bazy Tankersley of Al-Marah Arabians

Indraff (1938–1963) was a gray Arabian stallion, foaled on May 9, 1938 and bred by Roger Selby of Ohio. His sire was Raffles and his dam was Indaia. Both his sire and dam were bred by the Crabbet Arabian Stud in England and imported to the United States by Selby.

As a colt, before he grayed out, Indraff had a blaze and a front stocking. Indraff was sold as a young horse to Donald Schutz, who kept him as a breeding stallion for a number of years before selling him to Bazy McCormick Miller, later Bazy Tankersley of Al-Marah Arabians. Schutz used the money to begin Schutz Brothers, a business manufacturing horse equipment, ran today (the business has closed) by Schutz's son, Mitchell Schutz. Indraff was registered with the Arabian Horse Club Registry of America, the precursor to the Arabian Horse Association as number 1575.

Indraff sired 254 purebred Arabian foals, and had over 2700 grandget. He was one of the foundation sires of the Al-Marah breeding program, one of the most prolific and influential farms in United States Arabian breeding circles.

Indraff died on August 22, 1963.

== Pedigree ==
desert bred
Ibrahim (PASB); Polish Arabian Stud Book
desert bred
Skowronek (GSB); General Stud Book UK; 1909 gray
Rymnik (PASB)
Jaskolka (PASB)
Epopeja (PASB)
Raffles; 1926 gray imported UK
Ibrahim (PASB)
Skowronek (GSB)
Jaskolka (PASB)
Rifala (GSB); 1922 gray
Berk (GSB)
Rissla (GSB)
Risala (GSB)
Indraff; 1938 gray stallion
Feysul (GSB)
Rasim (GSB)
Risala (GSB)
Raseem (GSB); 1922 chestnut
Astraled
Rim (GSB)
Ridaa (GSB)
Indaia; 1927 bay imported UK
Rijm (GSB)
Nureddin (GSB)
Narghileh (GSB)
Nisreen (GSB); 1919 bay
Daoud (GSB)
Nasra (GSB)
Nefisa (GSB)
