= Raseyn =

20th-century Arabian stallion

- Raseyn as a young horse
- Breed: Arabian
- Sire: Skowronek (GSB)
- Grandsire: Ibrahim (PASB)
- Dam: Rayya (GSB)
- Maternal grandsire: Rustem (GSB)
- Sex: Stallion
- Foaled: 1923
- Country: United Kingdom
- Color: Gray
- Breeder: Lady Wentworth
- Owner: W. K. Kellogg

Honors
- sired one National Champion

Raseyn (1923–1959) was an Arabian stallion foaled in 1923 and bred by Lady Wentworth of the Crabbet Arabian Stud. After being imported into the United States by W.K. Kellogg in 1926. He was part of a large shipment of horses that Carl Schmidt, later Carl Raswan, purchased from Lady Wentworth for Kellogg's new ranch in Pomona, California.

Upon arrival in America, he was registered as number 597 with the Arabian Horse Club of America. Raseyn went on to sire twenty foal crops consisting of 135 purebred foals, including one National Champion. He was a gray horse who was very dark as a young animal, then lightened into a dapple gray for many years before his hair coat became completely white.

He was used as a jumper when he was young, and was also a five-gaited horse, able to perform the rack and the slow gait that are more typically found in the American Saddlebred. He passed this trait on to some of his descendants

After a number of years on the Kellogg ranch, he developed arthritis, possibly due to overuse as a young horse. When he was 25 years old, it was discovered that he had also become sterile. Instead of being euthanized, he was given to Alice Payne 1948. He lived with Mrs. Payne another four years, the last two in the company of another famous Skowronek son, Raffles, and died on May 19, 1952.

== Pedigree ==
desert bred
Ibrahim (PASB) (Poland Arabian Stud Book)
desert bred
Skowronek(GSB) (General Stud Book, England)
Kortez
Rymnik
Hama
Jaskoulka (PASB) (Poland Arabian Stud Book)
Derwisz
Epopeja
Lira
Raseyn; 1923 gray
Mesaoud
Astraled
Queen of Sheba
Rustem (GSB)
Merzuk
Ridaa
Rose of Sharon
Rayya (GSB); 1915 bay
Aziz
Mesaoud
Yamama III
Riada (GSB)
Jeroboam
Rosemary
Rodania
