= Hanstead House =

Country house in Hertfordshire, England

Coordinates: 51°42′15″N 0°20′49″W

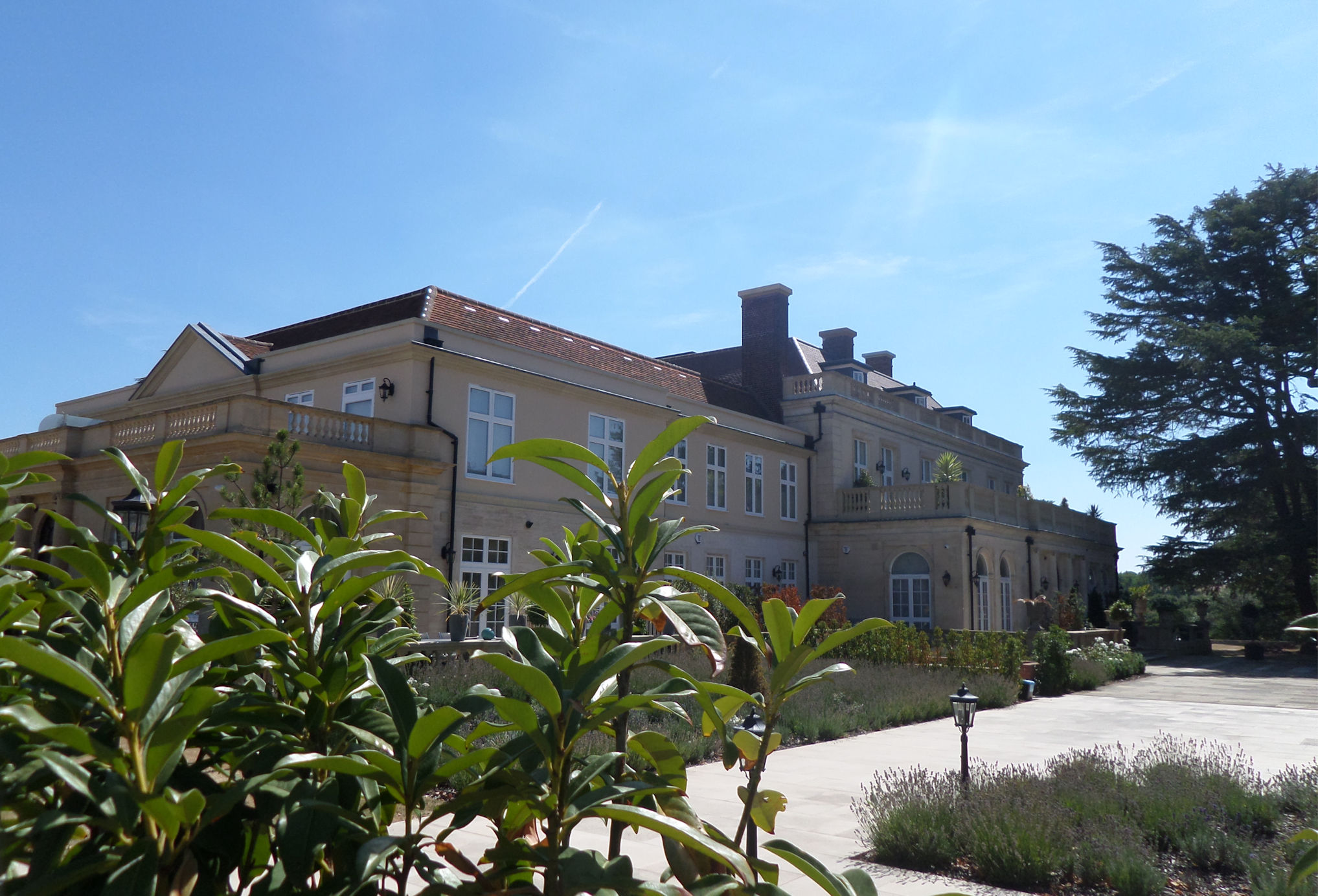
The house in Hanstead Park, 2022

Hanstead House or Hanstead Park is a country house estate in Hertfordshire, England. Hanstead is near Bricket Wood, about three miles from Radlett and five miles from St Albans, within the green belt around London. It forms part of the civil parish of St Stephen, Hertfordshire within St Albans District Council. The park has been a stud, a college, and a corporate training centre, and is now owned by a property development firm. The current building, though in the Georgian style, dates from 1925.

== Early history ==
The estate was mentioned in the Domesday Book:

In CASHIO Hundred The Abbot of St Albans holds HENĀMESTEDA. It answers for 20 hides. Land for 20 ploughs. In Lordship 6 hides; 3 ploughs there; a fourth possible. 26 villagers with 4 Frenchmen have 13 ploughs; a further 3 possible. 3 smallholders; 1 slave. 2 mills at 20s [Moor Mill and Park Mill]; meadow for 3 ploughs and 13s too; pasture for the livestock; woodland, 1000 pigs. The total value is and was £22 10s; before 1066 £25. This manor lay and lies in the lordship of St Albans Church.

== The Yule family ==
The house was built for the Yule family. Sir David Yule (1858–1928) was a Scottish entrepreneur who went into the family business, which was trade with India, then the "jewel in the crown" of the British Empire. He was involved with many additional businesses. The Oxford Dictionary of National Biography judged him "arguably the most important businessman in India" and quoted his obituary in The Times as "one of the wealthiest men, if not the wealthiest man, in the country".

A later owner of the property wrote: "In 1925 Sir David decided to build for himself a mansion on this 1200 acre [4.9 km²] estate, located only five miles [8 km] from the northwest edge of London. Prior to this he had built a 'modest' two-story house of some 14 rooms to live in during construction of the mansion. It was later to become the guest house."

Yule had married his cousin Annie Henrietta, oldest daughter of his uncle Andrew Yule of Calcutta. They had one child, Gladys. He died only three years after the construction of the house, and "lies buried in an admirably designed carved stone tomb, covered overhead by a stone and wood canopy, enclosed by an ornate iron fence inside a small wooded park, the whole being encircled by another iron fence." The Mausolea and Monuments Trust says that the sculpture itself is a draped chair with inscription from Kipling's Jungle Book and a box tomb showing his Indian jute mills and plantations.

The two women lived the rest of their lives at Hanstead. The new main house became the home of the daughter, while her mother lived in the guest house (see dower house). They were world travellers who reportedly shared an interest in big game hunting and a love of animals. Hanstead House was said to have been adorned by a large stuffed bear which they had killed in the Rocky Mountains of Colorado. On the grounds they kept a seal, penguins, and wallabies.

== The Arabian stud ==
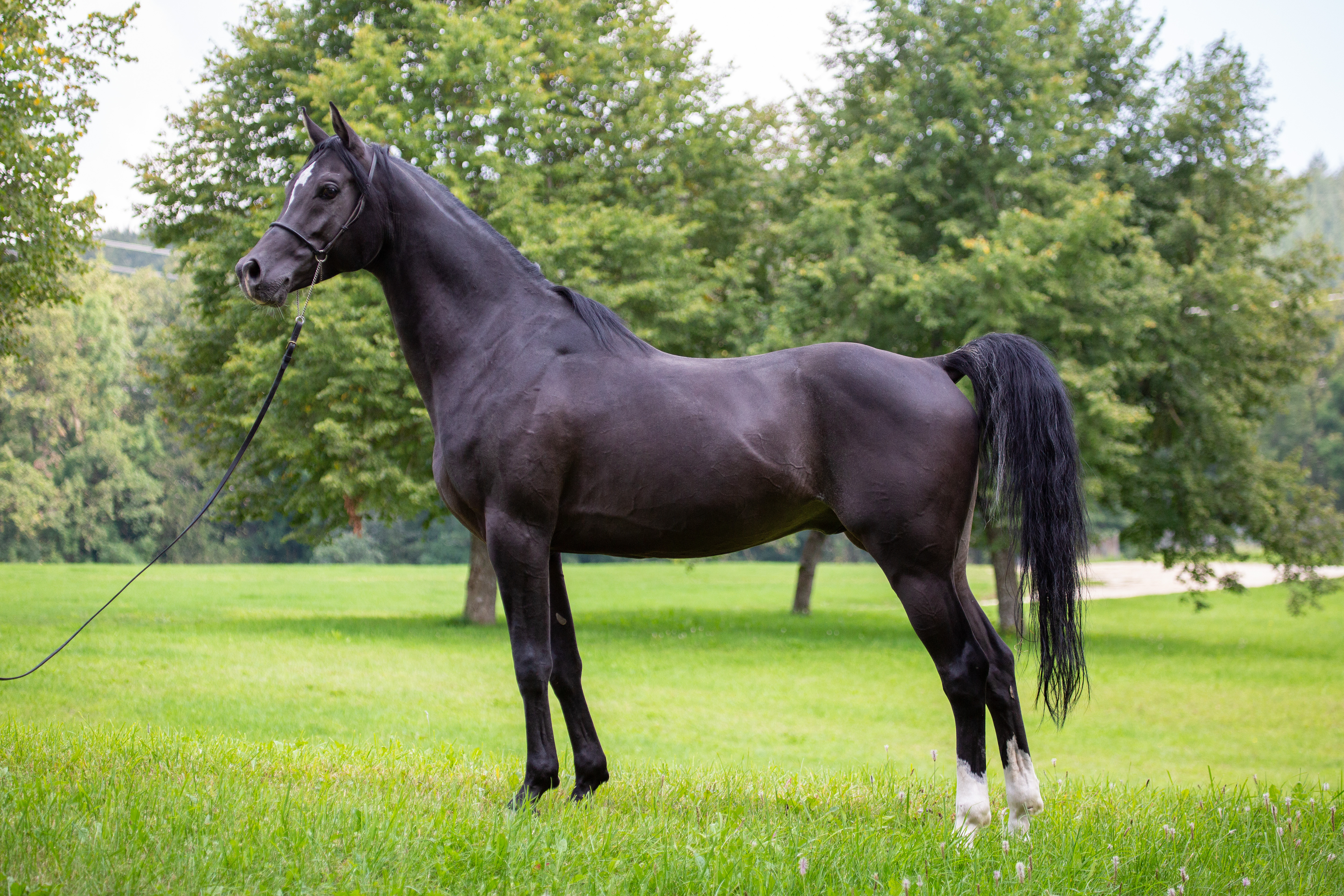
Arabian horse

In 1925 they expanded their interests to the breeding of Arabian horses. The two women used their considerable fortune to build stables, purchase breeding stock, and establish a stud. Despite its relatively late start, Hanstead was soon considered "second only in importance to" Crabbet Arabian Stud, whose founders, husband and wife team Wilfrid Scawen Blunt and Lady Anne Blunt, had introduced the breed to England in 1878, and from whom the Yules bought and leased horses. A third stud, Courthouse, was also held up to be of the same level, and the three competed against each other at the annual show at the Roehampton Club .

Gladys Yule died within a year of Judith Blunt-Lytton (Lady Wentworth), who had inherited Crabbet from her parents and run it for 40 years. The deaths of these two only children, at a time of high inheritance tax, meant that in 1957 a substantial number of British-bred Arabian horses left the country, improving the breed's bloodlines elsewhere. The Hanstead horses were appreciated in the United States and in South Africa.

== Ambassador College ==
Following the death of Gladys Yule in 1957, Hanstead Park was put on the market, where it remained uncared for over a considerable period of time. Many country houses were being demolished at this time.

In 1959 it was brought to the attention of the American evangelist Herbert W. Armstrong, who had arrived in England looking for a larger office for the British branch of his Radio Church of God. He bought the house and land as the site for his second Ambassador College campus. By the time of the purchase the guest house had already been sold separately, as a private home, to Mr Philip and Mrs Eileen Hubbard, who lived there with their daughter Vivien until 1970. The private residence was like an island within the campus. Armstrong wrote in Chapter 72 of his autobiography that Trans World Airlines (TWA) had been considering Hanstead House as a school for stewardesses. "Yet this mansion, with these outstanding gardens, the aviary, greenhouses, cedars of Lebanon, all finally came to us for £8,000 ($22,800) - the not uncommon price of a five- or six-room cottage on a forty- or fifty-foot lot in America, - and that on terms that gave us several years to pay."

In 1959 Hanstead House was renamed Memorial Hall in memory of Richard David Armstrong, Herbert's deceased son. The college at Bricket Wood began its first freshman year in 1960. (The first Ambassador College opened in 1947 at Pasadena, California; in 1964 a third college opened in Big Sandy, Texas which for a brief time became Ambassador University. All three colleges have since closed down.) From the radio studio of Ambassador College, daily broadcasts of The World Tomorrow were heard around the world on hundreds of stations. There was also a sizeable printing establishment on the site. Improvements were made to the grounds: tennis courts, track, gymnasium, and an Olympic standard (imperial measurements) indoor swimming pool.

== Corporate training centre ==
When Ambassador College closed its doors in 1974, the sports facilities were sold separately from the main buildings and eventually became part of a sports centre. The pool, one of the most modern in the area, became home to Verulam amateur swimming club in 1979.

The college became a corporate training centre, first for the Central Electricity Generating Board and then, from 1993, to the banking group HSBC. In 2004 a volunteer-led community woodland was established on land given by the bank; Hanstead Wood has won a Green Flag Award.

HSBC announced the closure of the centre in July 2011, moving its training to other group sites in India and Manila.

== Future developments ==
Hanstead Park was bought by St Congar Land, a property development company "with a general focus towards residential uses". They submitted plans to St Albans District Council for 167 new dwellings, plus the conversion of Hanstead House itself. The estate agent's particulars pointed out that the house is not a listed building, nor is the land a conservation area, meaning that the developer would be somewhat freer of constraints than in many similar sites. One of the St Congar directors referred to Hanstead Park as a brownfield site, i.e. previously developed land, although it sits within the Green Belt.

In 2018 the site was sold by St Congar and its partner Europa Capital to a joint venture between Linden Homes and Wates Developments. At this point, planning permission had been granted for 138 homes. Hanstead House was sold to Griggs Homes, which intends to convert the 1925 house into 11 apartments, anticipating completion in 2020.

There are still commercial stables operating from Hanstead, though as a livery yard and riding school rather than as a stud.
