= Stephen Catto, 2nd Baron Catto =

British banker and businessman

The Right Honourable The Lord Catto

Member of the House of Lords
- Lord Temporal
- In office 23 August 1959 – 11 November 1999 as a hereditary peer
- Preceded by: The 1st Baron Catto
- Succeeded by: Seat abolished (Note: Pursuant to the House of Lords Act 1999.)

Personal details
- Born: Stephen Gordon Catto; 14 January 1923
- Died: 3 September 2001 (aged 78)
- Political party: Crossbench
- Occupation: Banker, businessman

Stephen Gordon Catto, 2nd Baron Catto (14 January 1923 – 3 September 2001) was a British banker and businessman.

Catto was educated at Eton College and Trinity College, Cambridge, and then spent four years in the Royal Air Force Voluntary Reserve.

In 1948, he joined merchant bank Morgan Grenfell & Co., where his father had previously been a partner. He was appointed a director in 1957 and chairman of the bank in 1974. He became chairman of the group holding company, Morgan Grenfell Holdings, in 1979. Other directorships held included Yule Catto & Co plc (from 1960, Chairman from 1971 until 23 May 2000) and Times Newspapers Holdings Ltd. From 1963 to 1968 he was a part-time member of the London Transport Board.

== Arms ==
Coat of arms of Stephen Catto, 2nd Baron Catto
| Crest A wild cat sejant Proper resting the dexter paw on a garb Or. Escutcheon Or on a chevron between three lymphads Sable as many boars' heads couped of the field. Supporters On either side a tiger Proper charged on the shoulder with an ivy leaf Or. Motto Touch Not Gloveless |

== Notes ==
Citations

References

- Burk, Kathleen (1989). Morgan Grenfell 1838-1988: The Biography of a Merchant Bank. Clarendon Press. ISBN 978-0-19-828306-5.

Peerage of the United Kingdom
| Preceded by Thomas Catto | Baron Catto; 1959–2001; Member of the House of Lords (1959–1999) | Succeeded by Innes Catto |
Baronetage of the United Kingdom
| Preceded by Thomas Catto | Baronet of Peterhead; 1959–2001 | Succeeded by Innes Catto |
