= Baron Catto =

Barony in the Peerage of the United Kingdom

Baron Catto, of Cairncatto in the County of Aberdeen, is a title in the peerage of the United Kingdom. The only hereditary peerage newly conferred during the reign of King Edward VIII, the barony was created on 24 February 1936 for the businessman, banker and public servant, Sir Thomas Catto, 1st Baronet. He had already been created a baronet, of Peterhead, on 5 July 1921. As of 2018 the titles are held by his grandson, the third baron, who succeeded his father in 2001.

== Catto baronets (1921) ==
- Thomas Sivewright Catto, 1st Baronet (1879–1959)

=== Baron Catto (1936) ===
- Thomas Sivewright Catto, 1st Baron Catto (1879–1959)
- Stephen Gordon Catto, 2nd Baron Catto (1923–2001)
- Innes Gordon Catto, 3rd Baron Catto (b. 1950)

The heir presumptive is the present holder's brother, the Hon. Alexander Gordon Catto (b. 1952).
The heir presumptive's heir apparent is his son, Thomas Innes Gordon Catto (b. 1983).

== Line of succession ==
- Thomas Sivewright Catto, 1st Baron Catto (1879–1959)
  - Stephen Gordon Catto, 2nd Baron Catto (1923–2001)
    - Innes Gordon Catto, 3rd Baron Catto (born 1950)
    - (1) Hon. Alexander Gordon Catto (b. 1952)
      - (2) Thomas Innes Gordon Catto (b. 1983)
      - (3) Alastair Gordon Catto (b. 1986)
    - (4) Hon. James Stuart Gordon Catto (b. 1966)
      - (5) Hamish Robert Forrest Catto (b. 1998)
      - (6) Jock Stephen Gordon Catto (b. 2001)
      - (7) Angus James Gordon Catto (b. 2004)

== Arms ==
Coat of arms of Baron Catto
Crest A wild cat sejant Proper resting the dexter paw on a garb Or. Escutcheon Or on a chevron between three lymphads Sable as many boars' heads couped of the field. Supporters On either side a tiger Proper charged on the shoulder with an ivy leaf Or. Motto Touch Not Gloveless
