= Annie Henrietta Yule =

British businesswoman (1874–1950)

Annie Henrietta Yule, Lady Yule (née Yule; 1 August 1874 – 14 July 1950) was a British film financier and a breeder of Arabian horses. She co-founded the British National Films Company and Hanstead Stud, and commissioned the superyachts of her day.

== Early life and marriage ==
Annie Henrietta Yule was the only daughter of entrepreneur Andrew Yule and his wife, Emma Porter. She had a brother. The family's money came largely from the jute trade.

She was born in Calcutta on 1 August 1874. By the time she was six years old, the family were living in Dulwich, then part of Surrey.

Her father founded the conglomerate bearing his name, now owned by the Indian government, and (indirectly) Yule Catto & Co, now known as Synthomer plc. She married her cousin, Sir David Yule, on 12 December 1900 at St George's, Hanover Square. He had come out from Britain to join the family business. They had one child, a daughter, Gladys Meryl Yule (1903-1957).

Soon after the wedding, the couple moved to England; she refused to live in India after an attack of malaria, although her husband's business interests remained there, and so he was unable to spend much time in the UK. They purchased Hanstead, a country house estate in Bricket Wood, Hertfordshire, five miles from St Albans and not far from London.

Lady Yule and her daughter lived there for the rest of their lives. In 1925, the Yules commissioned a new house for the site, designed to appear Georgian.

== Widowhood and wealth ==
Sir David died in 1928, leaving his widow and daughter extremely wealthy women. Indeed, at one point, Lady Yule was known as the richest woman in the UK, even surpassing Lucy, Lady Houston, but, on her death, she left only $1.6 million. The New York Times reported that he left an estate of $100,000,000, equivalent to $1.6 billion in 2022 money.

== Yachts and travel ==
Lady Yule and Gladys were world travellers who reportedly shared an interest in big game hunting: Hanstead House was said to have been adorned by a large stuffed bear which they had killed in the Rocky Mountains of Colorado. In the grounds they kept a seal, penguins, and wallabies.

To facilitate their travels, Lady Yule ordered the large steam yacht Nahlin, from John Brown & Company of Clydebank, Glasgow. The name is taken from a Native American word meaning "fleet of foot" and the yacht has a figurehead depicting a Native American wearing a feathered headdress beneath the bowsprit.

Mother and daughter enjoyed a world cruise on the Nahlin from 1931 to 1933. The archives of this voyage, including the guest book, are held by the National Maritime Museum at Greenwich.

In 1936 they chartered the Nahlin to King Edward VIII for a summer cruise on the Adriatic with Wallis Simpson, then still married to her American husband. He had succeeded to the throne only months before, and chose a private hire, rather than the royal yacht Victoria and Albert, to "enable the avoidance of formality accorded to Royalty". As Lady Yule was a strict teetotaler, the king took over the library on the shade deck where he replaced the books with bottles. The presence of Simpson on board the yacht first "alerted the world's media to the impending abdication crisis." Informal photographs of Edward and Simpson on board together during the cruise were not published in Britain but became front-page news in the United States. During the cruise, Nahlin was escorted by HMS Glowworm, a Royal Navy destroyer.

The Yules sold the Nahlin to Carol II of Romania on the eve of World War II. The vessel, of a class now known colloquially as a superyacht, is as of 2022 owned by Sir James and Lady Dyson.

== Film financing ==
Her biographer in the Oxford Dictionary of National Biography, historian Richard Davenport-Hines, describes her as "restless and easily bored" and suggests she joined the film industry "as a diversion" from her widowhood, as her "commitment to filming was spasmodic".

According to the 1986 autobiography of the director Michael Powell, A Life in Movies, "she was casual, patriotic, and somewhat eccentric and saw in films a possible way to promote the British way of life." (Davenport-Hines also said she had "strong religious opinions, a sharp tongue, and imperious habits.") She co-founded British National Films Company with J. Arthur Rank and producer John Corfield in 1934, and was one of the first investors in Pinewood Film Studios, although she left the management of these investments to others. However she was involved in operation of the studios.

A 1952 biography of Rank devotes a chapter to "Lady Yule and Religion". This contained a dismissive analysis of Yule which has been criticised.

== Horse breeding ==
Lady Yule was more hands-on in the breeding farm she set up with her daughter at their home. They bred prize-winning cattle, and in 1925 turned their attention to Arabian horses. The Hanstead Stud became of national and international significance, "second only in importance to" Crabbet Arabian Stud. She showed more kindness to animals than to people, equipping her stables with mechanical drinking-troughs but expecting her staff to abstain from alcohol, as she did herself (although she was a heavy smoker).

In 1927, she purchased Balaton Lodge, a racing stable in Newmarket, the centre of thoroughbred breeding. In 1947, she handed that property over to the Veterinary Educational Trust (later the Animal Health Trust), and, in 1956, Gladys made it an outright gift. Posthumously named after her, the Gladys Yule Surgical Wing, with cutting-edge facilities to anesthetise horses, was opened by the Queen in 1961. The Trust was based at Balaton until 1999. The lodge and stable courtyard have been renovated, and are now separate dwellings.

== Death ==
Lady Yule died at her home on 14 July 1950, aged 75. She left £523,198 16s. 7d. to her daughter, an amount equivalent to £18,330,000.00 in 2022. Her only child, Gladys, survived her by seven years.

According to Filmink "she was involved in British National for fourteen years and it made scores of movies, most quite watchable, some of them classics (Contraband, One of Our Aircraft is Missing, Pimpernel Smith, Love on the Dole). Her involvement in the film industry might have been an indulgence, but she ran a studio as a proper business. She lost money on the enterprise, but many people do, and she hung in there."
