= Country house conversion to apartments =

Division of a large country house into separate apartments

Country house conversion to apartments is the process whereby a large country house, which was originally built to accommodate one wealthy family, is subdivided into separate apartments (i.e. flats or condos) to allow multiple residential occupancy by a number of unrelated families. They are usually, by virtue of their age or style, listed buildings. The re-purposing of these mansions is one alternative to their demolition; there was wide-spread destruction of country houses in 20th-century Britain, but remodelling them as multiple dwelling units became a more popular option after the Destruction of the Country House exhibition in 1974.

== History ==
In the United Kingdom, large country houses were built on estates in the 18th and 19th centuries to reflect a family's wealth and power, and to accommodate their extended family and a large number of servants required to maintain the house and the family's lifestyle. However, with the diminishing income from farming, the increasing wages of staff and their movement to cities, and the invention of electricity, plumbing and domestic appliances, large houses with many staff became impractical to maintain. From about the mid 20th century many country houses, in order to avoid their demolition or use by an institution, especially those further away from larger cities (and hence not a practical weekend country retreat for the wealthy), have been converted into apartments.

== Techniques ==
Subdivision can be vertical (i.e. a whole wing), horizontal (i.e. a whole or part of one floor), or a combination of both. Vertical conversions have the advantage of giving each apartment a range of different sized rooms, from large public reception rooms on the ground or first floor to smaller rooms on the lower-ground and upper floors for bedrooms. The disadvantage is that space is taken up by the artificial insertion of staircases for each apartment (unless service staircases already existed), and the residents are required to constantly walk up and down staircase to move throughout the home. The advantage of horizontal conversion is single level living, with the disadvantage that on the original public reception rooms level, larger rooms need to be partitioned or a mezzanine level added to maximise the space and provide smaller types of rooms.

The objective of the conversion is to maximise the retention of the house's original architectural features and decorations, while minimising structural changes. In the UK, planning permission for the conversion of listed buildings will often be granted with enabling development near the house (i.e. the construction of new housing), to help fund the project. In the UK, vertical conversions can sometimes be sold with freehold title, but horizontal conversions (or a mixture) must be sold as leasehold, with apartment lessees holding shares in a company that owns the building and land's freehold.

== Houses ==
List of country houses converted into apartments, by country, in chronological order by conversion dates. This excludes conversions into retirement homes, where the apartments are hotel-style, with communal dining and living rooms (e.g. the original Country Houses Association properties).

=== England ===
Uncertain date: Gledhow Hall, outside Leeds

==== 1940s ====
- Brambridge House, Colden Common, Hampshire – 1944 to early 1950s into 14 flats, with stables converted into houses (house freehold owned since 2001 by the M25 Group, with plans to convert it into 9 flats by Cavendish & Gloucester Plc).
- Fishers Hill House, Hook Heath, Surrey – 1947 into 4 homes, more a villa than a country house, built in 1900–1901 for the 2nd Earl of Balfour (brother of PM) by brother-in-law Sir Edwin Lutyens with gardens by Gertrude Jekyll.

==== 1950s ====
- Kearsney Court, Dover, Kent – c.1950 into 7 freehold properties, plus several new houses off the main drive.
- Westwood House, near Droitwich, Worcestershire – c.1950s into 12 apartments, with lodges, stables, coach house and walled garden converted into homes.

==== 1970s ====
- Yattendon Court, Berkshire – c.1972, into 14 apartments (built c.1926 for Edward Iliffe, 1st Baron Iliffe, with Lady Iliffe dying in 1972).
- Stedham Hall, Stedham, West Sussex – 1973, into apartments (unlisted house, enlarged from 1910).
- Wyke Hall, Gillingham, Dorset – 1973–1976, into 10 freehold dwellings (marketed in Country Life 4 April 1974 supplement page 16 for £18,000 – £28,000).
- Charlton Park, Wiltshire – 1975, into 19 apartments.
- Elston Hall, Elston, Nottinghamshire – from 1976, into 10 maisonettes.
- Hotham House, Hotham Park, Bognor Regis, West Sussex – from 1977 into several flats, then about 6 flats with leasehold of 125 years from 2008.
- Great Hyde Hall, Sawbridgeworth, Hertfordshire – 1978, into about 13 apartments, with around 9 in the stables, plus 5 semi-detached houses.
- Umberslade Hall, Tanworth in Arden, Warwickshire – 1978, into 12 apartments and 2 mews cottages.

==== 1980s ====
- Gunton Hall, Norfolk – 1980 by Kit Martin, estate into 20 dwellings.
- Blakesware Manor, Widford, Hertfordshire – From 1980 (formerly a monastery) converted into 5 freehold homes.
- Hazells Hall, Bedfordshire – 1981–82 by Kit Martin, into 8 houses and 4 apartments.
- Dingley Hall, Northamptonshire – early 1980s by Kit Martin, into 7 houses and 3 apartments.
- Oxton House, Oxton, Devon – 1980s into at least 8 apartments.
- Callaly Castle, Northumberland – 1986–1987 by Kit Martin.
- Ecton Hall, Ecton, Northamptonshire – 1986–1989 by Period Property Investments Plc (previously derelict), house into 12 apartments; stables, coach house, game larder, laundry and dairy into 7 homes; and 9 newly built 2-storey stone houses in two terraces.
- Sheffield Park House, Haywards Heath, East Sussex – c.1988 – early 1990s by Period Homes (Arundel Estate Sussex Ltd built a housing court in the grounds), 12 apartments in the house, with 30 acres.
- Strete Ralegh House, Whimple, Devon – 1985, formerly owned by the Imbert-Terry baronets, into at least 5 apartments.

==== 1990s ====
- Alkrington Hall, Alkrington, Greater Manchester – early 1990s into 4 freehold homes (main house into 2 semi-detached homes, with 2 wings into separate homes), and large urban development in the rear grounds.
- Astonbury Manor, Stevenage, Hertfordshire – early 1990s into apartments and mews style houses.
- Sandywell Park, Whittington, Gloucestershire – early 1990s (leasehold company incorporated in 1996) into 10 apartments.
- New Wardour Castle, Tisbury, Wiltshire – 1992 by Nigel Tuersley.
- Burley On The Hill, Rutland – 1993–1998 by Kit Martin, into 6 apartments, estate into 22 dwellings.
- Chelwood Vachery, Millbrook Hill, Nutley, East Sussex – 1996, into at least 4 freehold homes, with the stable courtyard into at least 6 homes.
- Stoneleigh Abbey, Stoneleigh, Warwickshire – 1996–2000 by Kit Martin, into 53 dwellings.
- Maristow House, Devon – 1996–2000 by Kit Martin.
- Bostock Hall, Bostock, West Cheshire – 1996–1997 by P J Livesey, into 7 apartments, within a total development of 68 apartments and homes, with the 17th century timber-framed Platt Hall moved and rebuilt in the grounds.
- Brasted Place, Kent – 1996–1997 by Hillgrove Homes and Michael J Wilson & Associates, into 7 apartments, in 8.5 acres.
- Shenley Manor (formerly Porters Park), Shenley, Hertfordshire – 199619–98 (Shenley Mental Hospital 1924–1998), into about 7 terraced houses, plus stables home, surrounded by a newly built housing estate.
- Heytesbury House, Heytesbury Park, Wiltshire – 1996–1999 by Sabre Developments (after 1996 fire during the ownership of George Sassoon), into 8 apartments, stables and coach house and servants' courtyard converted into 7 homes, 8 newly built houses in the walled garden and 2 new gatehouses.
- Hatchford Park, Cobham, Surrey – 1996–2005 by Latchmere Properties and Countryside Properties (fire in 2000 destroyed interiors near completion, house rebuilt) into 13 apartments and about 6 newly built houses in the grounds.
- Nashdom, Burnham, Buckinghamshire – from 1997, into apartments, with a new wing built.
- Goldings Hall, Hertford, Hertfordshire – from 1997.
- Gilston Park House, Gilston, Harlow, Essex – c1997–2001 by City and Country Group, into 31 apartments and newly built homes in the grounds.
- Hill Hall, Theydon Mount, Essex – 1998–2001 by P J Livesey (purchased from English Heritage in 1998), into 20 apartments and cottages.
- The Hermitage, Chester-le-Street, Durham – 1998–2001 by Bryant Homes and McCarrick Construction (formerly an NHS hospital and rehabilitation centre), into 15 apartments, with conversion of the nursery, stables and coach house, plus 30 newly built houses in the grounds.
- Nether Swell Manor, Lower Swell, Gloucestershire – 1998–c.2002 by Charles Church & Cheney Developments Limited (designed by Guy Dawber, purchased 1998), into 3 semi-detached houses and some outbuildings, plus c.8 newly built homes.
- Bishops Palace, North Lees, Ripon, North Yorkshire – c.1999 into 10 homes (including outbuildings such as the chapel), former palace of the Bishops of Ripon and Spring Hill School.
- St Leonards Park House, Horsham, West Sussex – 1999 by Rydon Homes.
- Netley Castle, Netley, Hampshire – c.1999 into 9 apartments, with a newly built wing in 2001.
- Rufford New Hall, Rufford, Lancashire – c.1999–c.2001 by P J Livesey (formerly a convalescent hospital), 9 apartments and mews homes in the Hall, 12 mews cottages in the stables courtyard, and 16 mews homes in the newly built North Wing by Wainhomes.
- Wyfold Court, Kingwood, Oxfordshire – 1999–2000 by P J Livesey Rural Heritage (formerly Borocourt Hospital), into 11 apartments, with over 20 newly built houses on the estate by Bellway Homes.
- Ingress Abbey, Greenhithe, Kent – 1999–c.2002 by P J Livesey Rural Heritage Ltd, planned into apartments, as part of a 950 new houses and apartments development in Ingress Park by Crest Homes. (Conversion was not carried out and Ingress Abbey is now a single family home.)
- Besford Court, Besford, Worcestershire – completed 2000, house into 8 apartments.

==== 2000s ====
- Rackheath Park, Rackheath, Norfolk – c2000-03, into 6 apartments, plus conversion of outbuildings, and new builds.
- Claybury Hall, Woodford Bridge, Greater London – 2000–03 by Crest Nicholson (purchased Claybury Hospital in 1997), into apartments, plus nearby new builds.
- Whitehayes (Sunnyhayes), Burton, Dorset – 2000–2002, into 5 apartments in the main house and 4 apartments in the adjoining wing.
- Gallowhill Hall, Whalton Park, Morpeth, Northumberland – 2000–2003 by NBP Whitelam Homes (unlisted, built 1888 by Charles Perkins for Lord Decies), formerly a school, into 7 houses and 6 flats, plus 3 new houses.
- Allerton Priory, Allerton, Merseyside – 2002 by P J Livesey (formerly a school), into 14 apartments and houses, with newly built houses and flats nearby in Ye Priory Court.
- Herringswell Manor, Herringswell, Suffolk – c.2002–2007 by City and Country Group.
- Dunston Hill Mansion House, Whickham, Gateshead, Tyne And Wear – 2003–2006 by McCarrick Construction (formerly a hospital), into 11 apartments, stables into 2 homes, plus newly built 10 flats and 24 dwellings.
- Compton House, Over Compton, Dorset – 2003–2005 by Clublight Developments, 4 apartments in the house and 4 in the stables.
- Holme Eden Hall, Cumbria – 2003–2004 by Cumbrian Homes.
- Eshton Hall, North Yorkshire – 2003–2005 by Burley Developments, into 8 apartments, plus 10 homes in the rear courtyard.
- Breakspear Place, Abbots Langley, Hertfordshire – until 2005 by Kebbell Homes, into 10 apartments and 3 mews cottages.
- Purley Park (Purley Magna), Berkshire – 2003–2006 by T A Fisher of Mortimer.
- Wall Hall, Aldenham, Hertfordshire – 2004–2008 by Octagon Development (formerly University of Hertfordshire campus), into 25 homes and 76 newly built houses and apartments.
- Apley Hall, Stockton, Shropshire – 2004–2007 by Earlstone (owned by Martin Ebelis).
- Albury Park, Albury, Surrey – from 2004 by Jennifer & Nigel Whalley (private owners), 37 apartments being slowly enlarged and sold.
- Clifton Hall, Nottingham – 2005–2006 by Chek Whyte, into 2 houses (North and South Wings), plus 15 newly built houses.
- Swaylands House, Penshurst, Kent – 2005–2008 by Oakdene Homes plc (school 1950s–1994), 28 apartments, plus 20 apartments in 2 new buildings (Drummond Hall and Woodgate Manor).
- Dropmore House, Burnham, Buckinghamshire – 2005–2010.
- Temple Grove House, Buxted, East Sussex – 2005–2011 by Stonehurst Estates, 14 apartments.
- Summers Place, Billingshurst, West Sussex – 2007–2009 by The Berkeley Group (Sotheby’s southern counties headquarters 1984–2007).
- Essendon Hall (Essendon Place), Essendon, Hertfordshire – 2007–2010 by P J Livesey (formerly Eastern Electricity Staff Training College), into 10 flats and 7 mews houses.
- Breakspear House, Harefield, Greater London – 2007–2012 by Clancy Developments (formerly an unoccupied Council care home), into 9 apartments and 2 lodges, plus 8 new built homes (Ashby Mews and Drakes Row).

==== 2010s ====
- Riber Castle, Matlock, Derbyshire – 2000–2015 by Cross Towers Ventures (permission in 2006, legal issues resolved in 2009), into 26 apartments, plus 9 in the service courtyard, and 11 new dwellings (total 46 dwellings).
- Roehampton House, Roehampton, London – c.2009–2013 by St James Homes of the Berkeley Group, into 24 apartments and houses.
- Corngreaves Hall, Cradley Heath, West Midlands – 2009–2013 by GR8 Space (sold by Sandwell Council), into 9 apartments, with 6 newly built terraced houses to the west of the house.
- Balls Park, Hertford, Hertfordshire – 2010–2013 by City and Country Group (bought in 2001, developed 2003–08), into 40 apartments.
- Kingswood Warren Park, Kingswood, Surrey – 2010–2013 by Octagon Developments (house purchased from the BBC in 2008), into 8 apartments, with 14 newly built houses.
- Thirlestaine House, Thirlestaine Park, Cheltenham, Gloucestershire – c.2012–2014 by Berkeley Homes and Beechcroft Developments (former Chelsea Building Society site), into 7 apartments, with Thirlestaine Villas remaining as residential houses, and 49 newly built apartments and a 63-bed care home and 24 assisted living flats.
- Hanstead House, Radlett, Hertfordshire – a 1925 Georgian house into 11 two-bedroom apartments,

==== In progress ====
- Melton Constable Hall, Melton Constable, Norfolk – owned since 1986 by investor and property restorer Roger Gawn, existing residential wings have been subdivided into houses and 2 apartments, but main Hall will remain as one property, with all outbuildings retained, maintaining the integrity of the whole.
- St Osyth Priory, St Osyth, Essex – owned and lived in by the Sergeant family of the City and Country Group since 1999, seeking planning permission since 2009.
- Danbury Place, Essex – owned by Wilson Properties since about 2008, from 2012 converting into 13 flats, Coach House into 6 mews style houses, and 27 newly built houses.
- Cromford Court, Matlock Bath, Derbyshire – owned by developers Derbyshire Investments, currently 11 unrenovated apartments, but could become a hotel or nursing home.
- RAF Bentley Priory, Harrow, London – owned since 2010 by City & Country, converting the Priory buildings into homes and a museum, with Barratt Homes building new homes on the estate.
- Copsewood Grange, Coventry, Warwickshire – since 2012 by BL Goodman & Morris Homes, into 17 apartments, plus gate lodge, as part of 329 new homes and retail unit.
- Stone Cross Mansion, Ulverston, Cumbria – planning permission being sought in 2014 by Charles Church to convert into 20 apartments, with 52 newly built houses.
- Sandhill Park, Bishops Lydeard, Somerset – purchased by Strongvox Homes in 2013, being converted into 26 apartments by Devington Homes, with 28 newly built houses in the grounds.
- Mount Oswald Manor House, Durham, County Durham – purchased by Banks Group in May 2014, being converted into apartments, with large developments in the 33-acre grounds.

=== Scotland ===
- Whittingehame House, Whittingehame, East Lothian.
- Smyllum House, Smyllum Park, Lanark, South Lanarkshire – c.1998–c.2003 by the Burrell Company, into 5 flats plus 2 newly built rear wings of 6 homes and garages (rear wings and Category B listed chapel demolished).
- Dollarbeg Castle, Dollarbeg Park, Dollar, Clackmannanshire – 2007 by Manor Kingdom, into 10 apartments, renovation design by HFM and James Moles (Manor Kingdom) plus 30 new build houses.

==== In progress ====
- Larbert House, Larbert, Falkirk – owned since the 1920s until 2013 by NHS Forth Valley (previously Sir John Graham, built 1822 for Sir Gilbert Stirling), Category B listed house in ruinous condition being converted into 12 apartments, restoration design by James Moles (Strathyre Properties) plus 8 in a new extension) stables into 8 mews, walled garden 8 new houses, 10 mews in a 2nd new stable block, plus 11 nearby new homes.

=== Wales ===
- Talygarn Manor, Pontyclun, Glamorganshire – c.2000 by Cowbridge Developments Ltd, including 55 newly built houses and apartments, and 6 converted cottages.

==== In progress ====
- Kinmel Hall, St. George, Conwy – owned by developers Derbyshire Investments since 2006, may become apartments, hotel or offices.

=== Northern Ireland ===
- Gosford Castle, Gosford, County Armagh – 2006–2008 by Gosford Castle Developments, into 23 flats.
