= North Lees =

Hamlet in North Yorkshire, England

Coordinates: 54.1599°N 1.5415°W

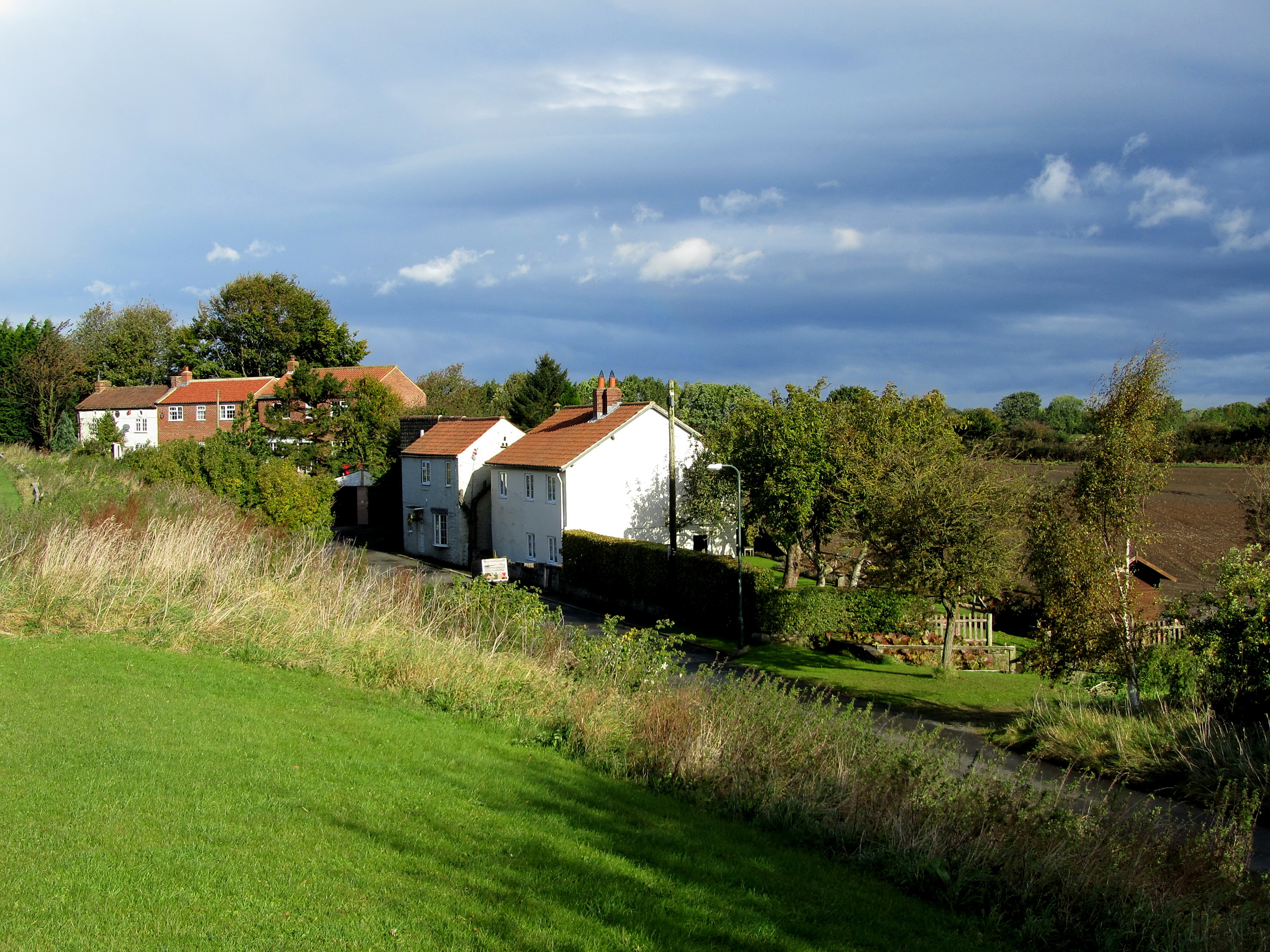
- Houses in North Lees

- Location within North Yorkshire
- OS grid reference: SE284743
- Unitary authority: North Yorkshire
- Ceremonial county: North Yorkshire
- Region: Yorkshire and the Humber
- Country: England
- Sovereign state: United Kingdom
- Post town: RIPON
- Postcode district: HG4
- Police: North Yorkshire
- Fire: North Yorkshire
- Ambulance: Yorkshire

North Lees is a hamlet in the county of North Yorkshire, England. It is about 1.9 miles (3 km) north of Ripon on the A6108 road. The village is just south of Lightwater Valley and is served by a bus service four times a day between Ripon and Leyburn.

From 1974 to 2023 it was part of the Borough of Harrogate, it is now administered by the unitary North Yorkshire Council.

On the south eastern side of the village is the remains of a medieval moat and possibly the site of a Pele tower. Land towards the south western side was used as a firing range during the First World War. Other medieval (and possibly Roman) earthworks have been destroyed when the A6108 road was widened in the 20th century.

On 5 July 2014, the Tour de France Stage 1 from Leeds to Harrogate passed through the village.
