= Nahlin (yacht) =

Scottish-built luxury yacht, once used by UK and Romanian royalty

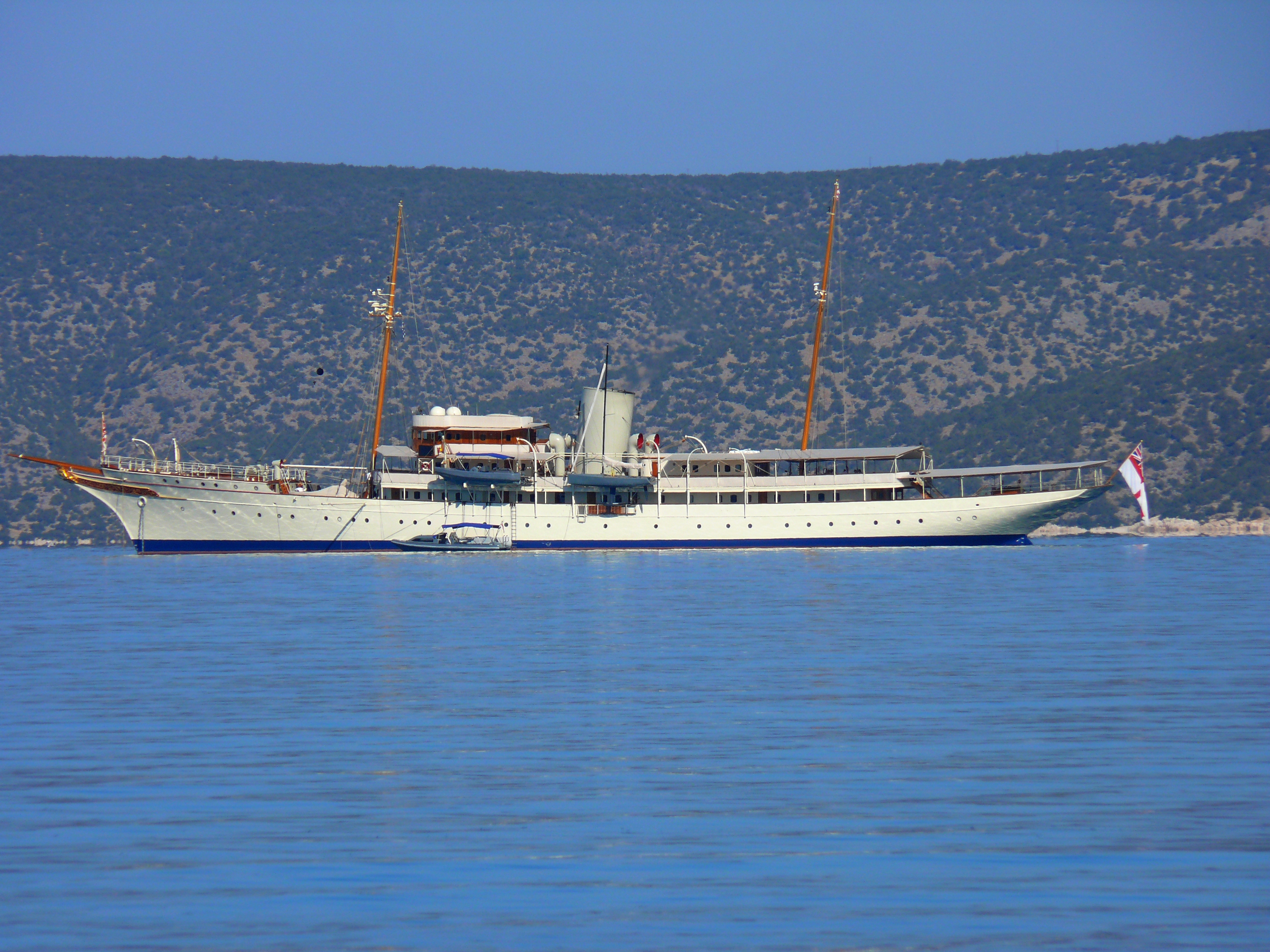
- Nahlin in the Aegean Sea in 2017

History
- Name: 1930: Nahlin; 1937: Luceafărul; 19XX: Răsăritul; 19XX: Transilvania; 1948: Libertatea; 1999: Nahlin
- Namesake: 1930: "fleet of foot"; 1937: Evening Star; 19XX: Sunrise; 19XX: Transylvania; 1948: Liberty
- Owner: 1930: Annie Henrietta Yule; 1937: Carol II of Romania; 1940: Romanian Ministry of Culture; 1948: Romanian Navy; 1953: Government of Romania; 1999: Edmiston & Co; 2005: Zarqa Marine; 2006: Blue Bay Marine; 2011: ATO Marine LLP; 2011: James & Deirdre Dyson
- Port of registry: 1930: (United Kingdom) Glasgow; 1937: (Romania); 1999: (United Kingdom) Glasgow; 2006: (Isle of Man) Douglas; 2011: (United Kingdom) London
- Builder: John Brown & Co, Clydebank
- Yard number: 533
- Launched: 28 April 1930
- Completed: 10 July 1930
- Refit: 2005–09
- Identification: 1930–37: UK official number 161925; 1930–34: code letters LGFP; 1930–37: call sign GLFB; Currently: IMO number: 1009417; MMSI number: 235075032; call sign: 2CQY6
- Status: in service
- Naval architect: GL Watson & Co
- Interior designer: Charles Allom

General characteristics
- Type: luxury yacht
- Tonnage: 1930: 1,392 GRT, 556 NRT; Currently: 1,277 GRT, 1,574 tons Thames Measurement
- Displacement: 2,017 tonnes
- Length: 300 ft (91.4 m) overall; 268.3 ft (81.8 m) registered
- Beam: 36.2 ft (11.0 m)
- Draught: 14.5 ft (4.4 m)
- Depth: 18.8 ft (5.7 m)
- Installed power: 1930: 3,300 shp; 2005: 5,004 bhp (3,731 kW)
- Propulsion: 2 × screw propellers; 1930: 4 × steam turbines + reduction gearing; 2005: 2 × diesel engines + electric transmission
- Speed: Since 2005: 17.4 knots (32 km/h) (maximum); 16.1 knots (30 km/h) (cruising)
- Capacity: 14 passengers
- Crew: As built: 60; currently: 47

Nahlin is a luxury yacht that was built in Scotland in 1930. She was a turbine-powered steam yacht until 2005, when she was re-fitted with a diesel–electric powertrain. Her current owners are Sir James and Lady Dyson.

Nahlin spent her early years in private British ownership. In 1936 King Edward VIII and Wallis Simpson cruised parts of the Mediterranean on her, causing the scandal that led to the abdication crisis.

In 1937 she became the royal yacht of King Carol II of Romania, who renamed her Luceafărul. Later in Romanian service she was renamed Răsăritul, and then Transilvania. In 1947 the Kingdom of Romania became a Communist republic, and in 1948 the yacht was renamed Libertatea.

In 1999 the yacht was brought back to the United Kingdom, and her original name Nahlin was reinstated. She spent most of the 2010s in Germany being restored prior to resuming the role of a private yacht.

== Building ==
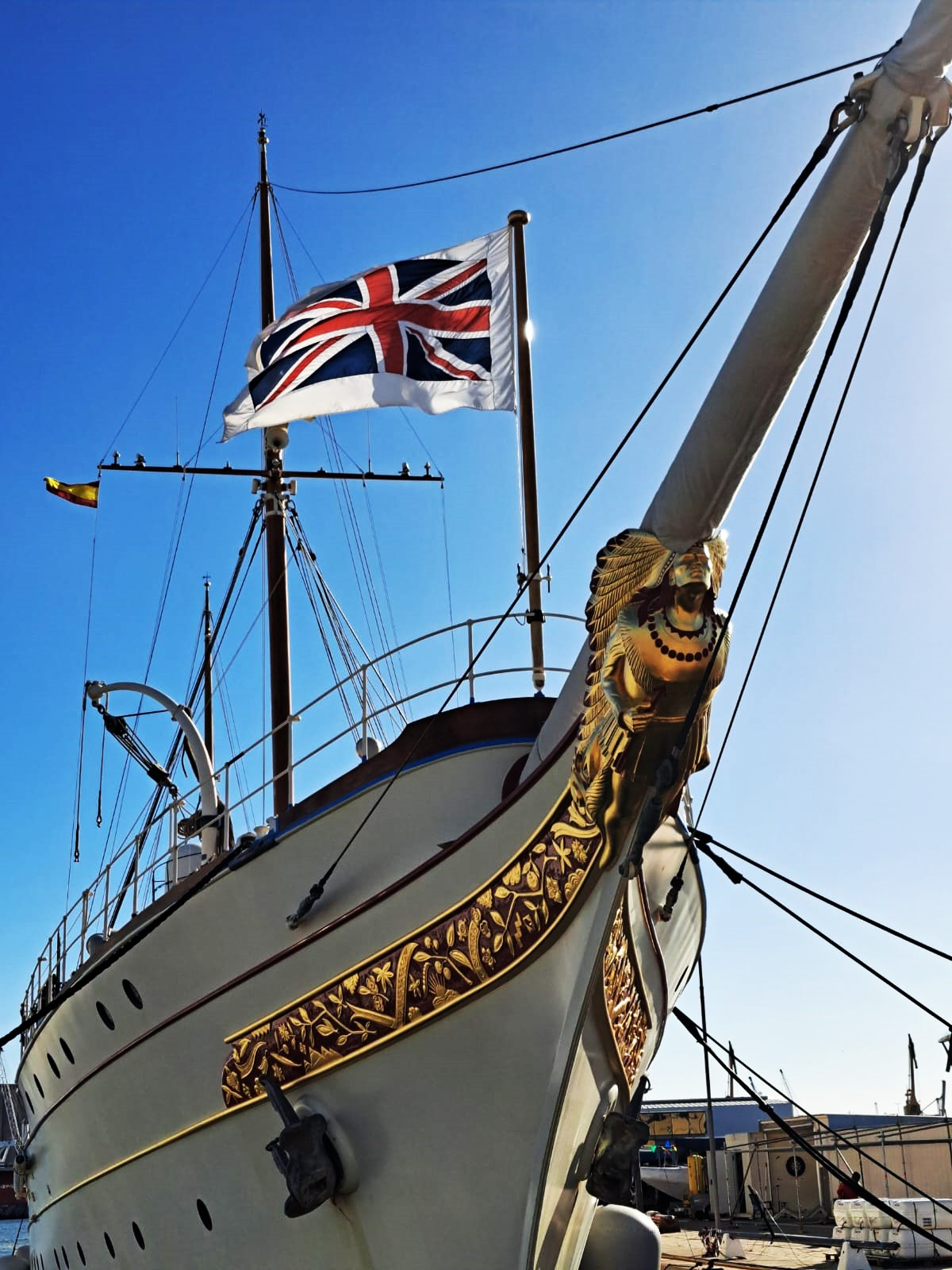
Figurehead of Nahlin

John Brown & Company built the yacht in 1930 in Clydebank, Glasgow, for the Scottish heiress, financier and horse breeder Lady Yule. She was built as yard number 533, launched on 28 April as Nahlin, and completed in 10 July. Yule's daughter Gladys launched her. She is the only vessel built by John Brown & Co still sailing. Nahlin is a native American word meaning "swift runner" or "fleet of foot". Her figurehead is a representation of a native American wearing a feather headdress.

Nahlin's lengths were 300 ft (91.4 m) overall and 268.3 ft (81.8 m) registered. Her beam was 36.2 ft (11.0 m) and her depth was 18.8 ft (5.7 m). As built, her tonnages were 1,392 GRT and 556 NRT.

G L Watson & Co were her naval architects, and Sir Charles Allom was her interior designer. She was furnished with six en-suite staterooms for guests, a gymnasium, a ladies' sitting room with sea views on three sides, and a library on the shade deck.

Nahlin's original engines were a set of four Brown-Curtis stream turbines, two driving each propeller via single-reduction gearing. The combined power of her four engines was rated at 3,300 shp. Steam was supplied by two Yarrow boilers with oil-burning furnaces.

== Nahlin ==
Lady Yule registered Nahlin at Glasgow. The yacht's United Kingdom official number was 161925. Until 1934 her code letters were LGFP, and until 1937 her wireless telegraph call sign was GLFB.

In August 1930 Lady Yule and her daughter made a World cruise aboard Nahlin. They visited Australia, and in 1931 reached New Zealand. In 1933 in Miami the yacht's speedboat won an All Comers race.

Nahlin was among the civilian ships that attended a Naval Review in 1935 to mark the Silver Jubilee of George V. Lady Yule invited Edward, Prince of Wales, aboard, and he "greatly admired" the yacht.

In January 1936 George V died, and the Prince of Wales succeeded his father as King Edward VIII. That August, Edward chartered Nahlin for a cruise from Šibenik on the Adriatic Sea, via the Corinth Canal and Aegean Sea, to Istanbul. He chose Nahlin rather than the Royal Yacht Victoria and Albert to "enable the avoidance of formality accorded to Royalty", because Wallis Simpson accompanied him. The Royal Navy destroyers HMS Glowworm and Grafton escorted the yacht.

Lady Yule was a teetotaller, so Nahlin had nowhere to store or serve alcoholic drinks. Edward converted the library by replacing the books with bottles.

Edward and Mrs Simpson were photographed together on their cruise. UK newspapers declined to published the photos, but they became front-page news in the United States and mainland Europe. This "alerted the World's media to the impending abdication crisis."

== Romanian service ==
In 1937 King Carol II of Romania bought the yacht for £120,000 and renamed her Luceafărul, which is Romanian for "Evening Star". Later she was renamed Răsăritul ("Sunrise"), and then Transilvania after the province of Transylvania, which had been transferred from Hungary to Romania after the First World War. In September 1940 Carol II was forced to abdicate in favour of his son Michael, and that November Romania joined the Axis powers. The yacht was transferred to the Ministry of Culture, and laid up until after the war.

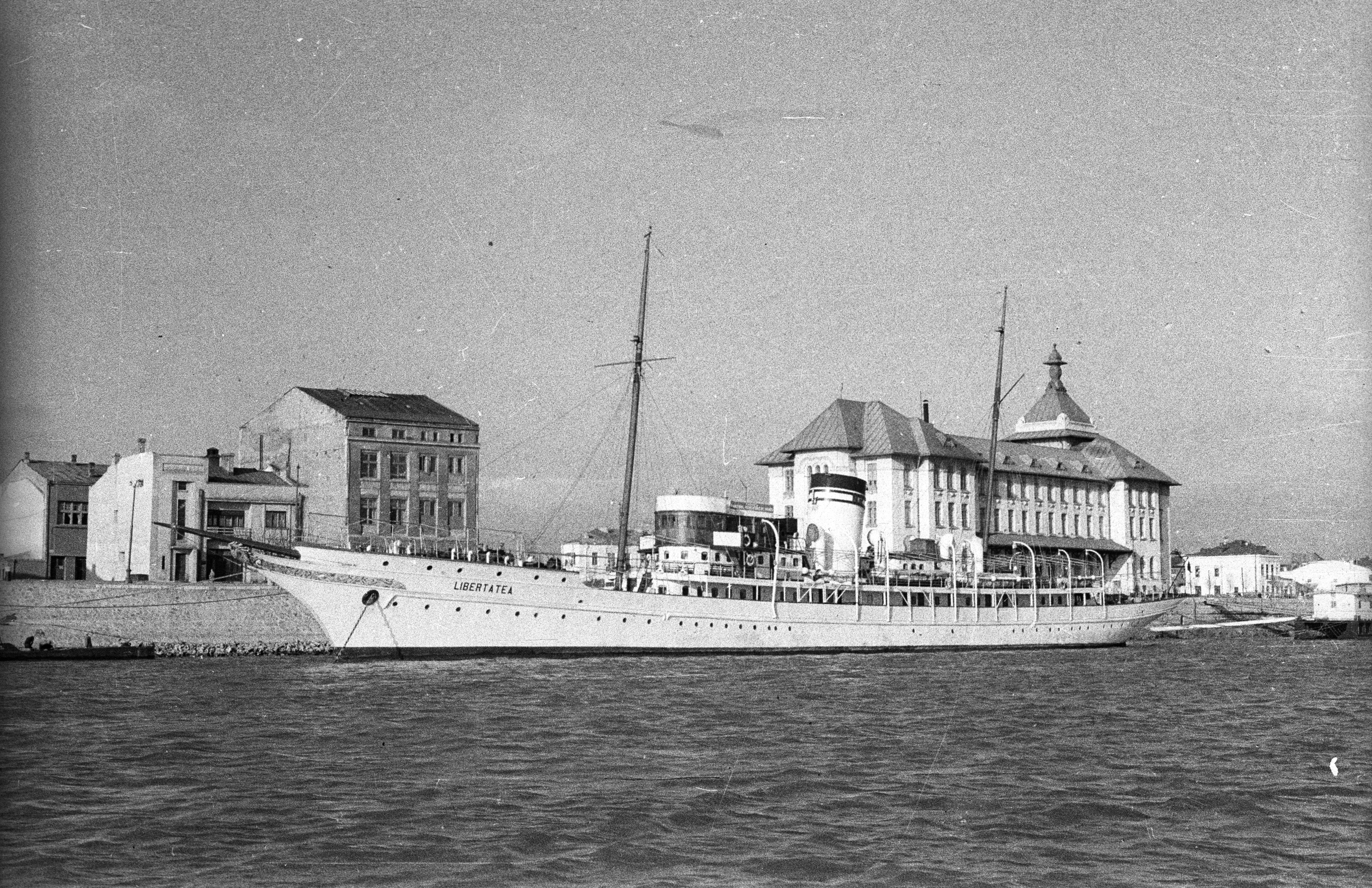
Libertatea at Galați on the Danube in 1961

In December 1947 King Michael was forced to abdicate, and the Socialist Republic of Romania was established. In 1948 the yacht was transferred to the Romanian Navy and renamed Libertatea. She later became a museum ship, and then a floating restaurant moored at Galați on the Danube.

== Restoration as Nahlin ==
At the end of 1989 Communism was overthrown in Romania. Libertatea was classified as cultural patrimony, but dubiously became property of a small Romanian private company called SC Regal SA Galaţi. In the 1990s a British couple, Bill & Laurel Cooper, sailed a Dutch barge down the Danube. In a book published in 1997 they reported that at Galaţi "Ceaușescu's classic motor yacht dripped and rusted as the quay, beautiful, but neglected since the fall of his regime".

In 1998 the yacht broker Nicholas Edmiston bought Libertatea for $265,000. The Romanian Government issued a temporary permit for her to be taken out of Romania, supposedly to be restored by her builders GL Watson & Co, who still had her original plans. She was taken to Falmouth, Cornwall aboard the heavy-lift ship Swift.

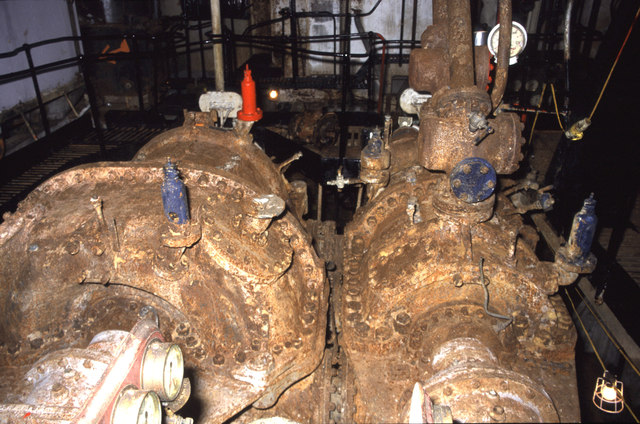
Two of the yacht's Brown-Curtis steam turbines in 2001, when she was in Liverpool

The yacht was then towed to Devonport, Plymouth and then to Clarence Dock, Liverpool for restoration. The first phase of her restoration was delayed when her restorer, Cammell Laird, went into receivership in 2001.

On 27 July 2005 the yacht left Liverpool for Rendsburg in Germany, where Nobiskrug continued her refit. As refitted, she has berths for 14 passengers and up to 47 crew. She was then taken to Hamburg, where Blohm+Voss replaced her steam turbines with a new diesel-electric powertrain. MTU Friedrichshafen supplied a pair of 16-cylinder diesel engines, each of which is rated at 2,502 bhp (1,866 kW). They drive a pair of electric generators, which in turn drive a pair of electric motors, one powering each propeller. Each electric motor is rated at 2,000 kW (2,700 hp).

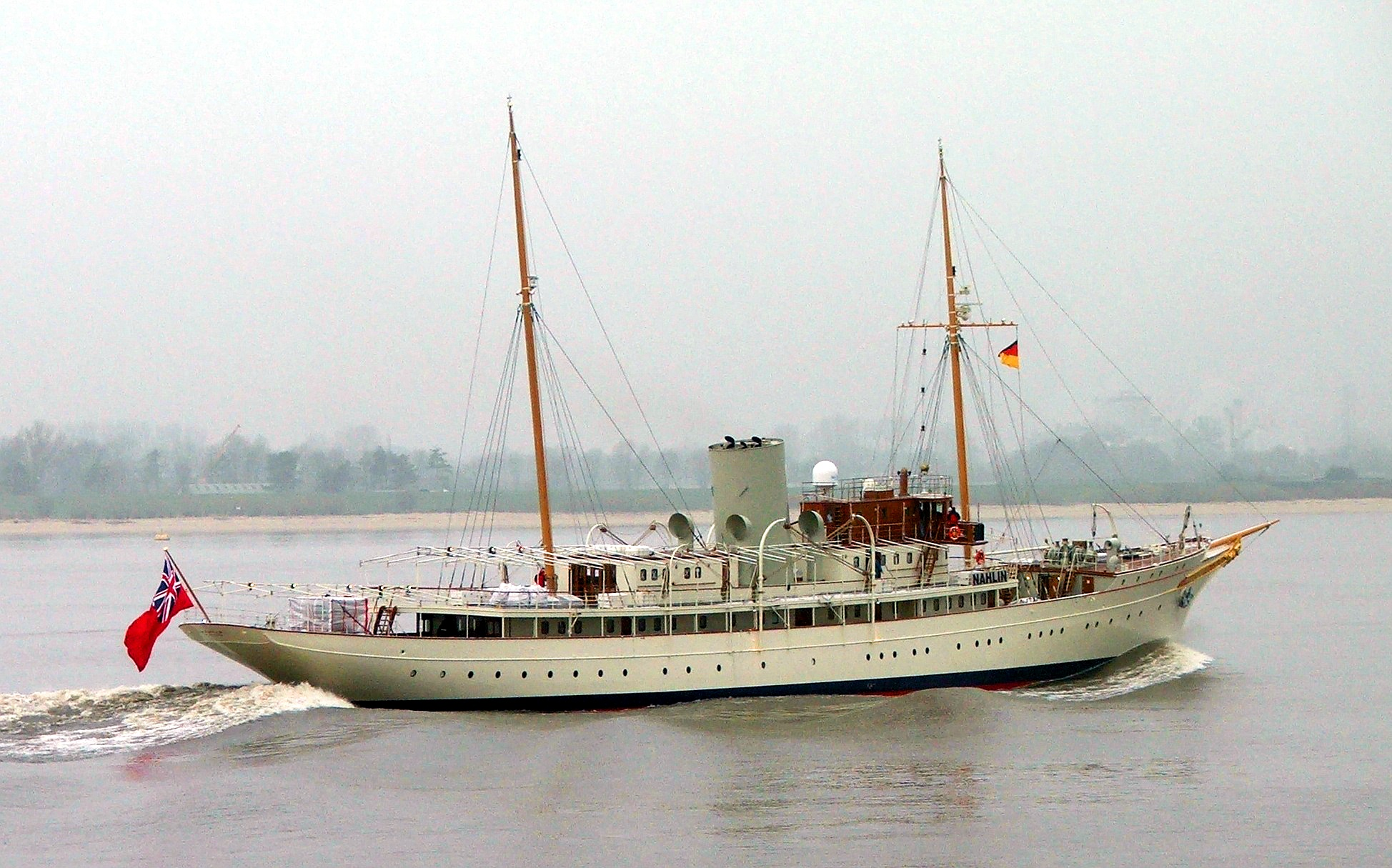
Nahlin on a sea trial in 2009

During restoration, Nahlin's original mahogany-hulled 6.4 m (21 ft) ship-to-shore tender, believed lost for 60 years, was found in Scotland, having been fully restored by owner Willie McCullough. It has now been reunited with the yacht.

In 2006 Sir James and Lady Dyson acquired the yacht from Anthony Bamford. In 2010 she was registered in Glasgow under her original name Nahlin, and returned to service.

== See also ==
- List of motor yachts by length

== Bibliography ==
- Crabtree, R (1975). Royal Yachts of Europe: From the Seventeenth to Twentieth Century. Newton Abbot: David & Charles. ISBN 0715367544.
