= Andrew Yule =

Andrew Yule (2 November 1834 – 18 July 1902) was a businessman who founded Andrew Yule and Co.

== Early life ==
Andrew was born in Stonehaven-Fetteresso, Scotland, the third and youngest son of Robert Yule, a clothier, and his wife Elizabeth. He had two older brothers, David, a cashier at Register House in Edinburgh, and George, also an entrepreneur and trader.

== Career ==
Andrew and George moved from Scotland to Manchester around 1855. Three years later, in 1858, they formed a partnership as warehousemen. The same year, encouraged by profits to be made in colonial trade, Andrew moved to India.

One of the first businesses he established there was the Hoolungpooree Tea company. In 1866, he formed Andrew Yule and Co and established operations in Calcutta (now Kolkata). The company was one of the pioneers of the extension of the cotton spinning industry to Bengal. Hand spinning had been widespread in Bengal in previous centuries, but cotton mills (factories) had previously been confined to the city of Bombay. He also acted as trade representative for several companies. By 1875, he had established interests in jute, cotton and coal as well as in tea. That year, his brother George and their nephew David left England to settle in India.

== Later life and legacy ==
Andrew visited England frequently and finally retired there in 1888, settling in Dulwich (now a part of London). He died at his residence, in Dulwich Park Road, on 18 July 1902.

He had a daughter, Annie Henrietta Yule (1874 – 1950), who married her cousin. David eventually inherited all of the family's enterprises. As a wealthy widow, Annie spent the latter decades of her life as a film financier and a breeder of Arabian horses at the Hanstead Stud, alongside their only child, Gladys Yule.
