= Raffles (horse) =

20th-century Arabian stallion

- Raffles as an older stallion
- Breed: Arabian
- Sire: Skowronek
- Grandsire: Ibrahim (PASB)
- Dam: Rifala
- Maternal grandsire: Skowronek
- Sex: Stallion
- Foaled: 1926
- Country: United Kingdom
- Color: Gray
- Breeder: Lady Wentworth
- Owner: Roger Selby; Alice Payne

Honors
- 1933 Three-gaited champion National Horse Show
- Last updated on: January 13, 2008.

Raffles was an Arabian stallion foaled in 1926 and imported to the United States by Roger Selby in 1932. Raffles was bred by Lady Wentworth of the Crabbet Arabian Stud.

== Background ==
Raffles was a son of the Crabbet foundation sire Skowronek, out of a Skowronek daughter, Rifala. Lady Wentworth deliberately chose an inbreeding cross in hopes of producing a suitable Arabian for crossing on Welsh ponies. She partially succeeded, as Raffles only matured to be 13.3 hands (55 inches, 140 cm). However, Raffles never produced any offspring in England, and it is generally thought that his handlers at Crabbet believed he was sterile.

He came to America as a free gift included with a group of Arabians that Roger Selby purchased from Lady Wentworth, Selby had previously purchased Raffles' dam, Rifala in 1928. There is an alternative theory to why Raffles was given to Selby; in January 1932, Selby told Lady Wentworth that Rifala was infertile, thus, rather than being a sterile throwaway, a gift of a perfectly fertile Raffles was a replacement. However, at the time Rifala was in foal to a Saddlebred, and safely delivered the foal later in 1932.

== Life in the United States ==
Upon his arrival in America, Raffles did not sire any purebred foals until 1938. The popular explanation is that only after he was placed under a proper management regimen, did he turn out to be fertile. However, there are other theories. According to Selby's trainer, Jimmie Dean, after Raffles tested sterile at Ohio State University, Dean wondered if anxiety and tension was the source of the trouble. According to Dean, Raffles had endured poor handling, was distrustful of humans, and difficult to ride. With the assistance of Dean's wife, Thelma, a skilled horsewoman in her own right, they spent many months gentling Raffles and gaining his trust. Thelma in particular spent many months simply taking him on low-stress, relaxing rides around the farm and surrounding land. After this retraining, he was put to a couple of pony mares in 1936, settled both mares, and thus, proven to be fertile, was bred to purebred mares in the 1937 breeding season.

Yet another version claimed that Raffles was such an outstanding riding horse that he could not be spared for stud duties. And indeed, he did well in the show ring. Awards and honors Raffles earned included the 1933 three-gaited championship at Nashville, Tennessee's Nashville National horse show. A final theory is that he was discounted as a breeding stallion, was viewed merely as a potential pony sire, and only used on purebred mares after the Arabian horse expert Carl Raswan urged Selby to do so.

However, once put to stud, he went on to have a tremendous influence on Arabian horse breeding in the United States, siring 122 foals. In addition to horses he produced by outcrossing on Arabians of other bloodlines, breeders also had very good results by linebreeding his offspring to those of Raseyn, another Skowronek son who had also been purchased from Lady Wentworth and was imported to the USA by W.K. Kellogg. Among his better-known offspring were Indraff, Rapture, and Azraff.

He broke a hind leg in 1950, when kicking his stall. He recovered and shortly thereafter was purchased by Alice Payne for her Asil Ranch in Chino, California, where he was stalled next to another Skowronek son, Raseyn, whom Payne had obtained from the Kellogg ranch in his old age. Raffles died on May 11, 1953.

desert bred
Ibrahim (PASB) (Poland Arabian Stud Book)
desert bred
Skowronek(GSB) (General Stud Book, England)
Kortez
Rymnik
Hama
Jaskolka (PASB) (Poland Arabian Stud Book)
Derwisz
Epopeja
Lira
Raffles; 1926 gray stallion
desert bred
Ibrahim
desert bred
Skowronek
Rymnik
Jaskoulka
Epopeja
Rifala (AHR 815) imp. USA 1928
Seyal
Berk
Burka
Rissla (GSB)
Mesaoud
Risala
Ridaa

== Registry data ==
Raffles was registered with the Arabian Horse Club Registry of America, the precursor to the Arabian Horse Association as number 952. His registration lists him as a "white" horse, even though he was actually a gray.

== See also ==
- Crabbet Arabian Stud
- Arabian horse
- Skowronek
