= Andrew Yule and Company =

Indian central public sector undertaking

Andrew Yule and Company Ltd.
- Company type: Central Public Sector Undertaking
- Traded as: BSE: 526173; NSE: ANDREWYULE
- Founded: 1863
- Founder: Andrew Yule
- Headquarters: Kolkata, India
- Key people: Shri Ananta Mohan Singh (Chairman & Managing Director)
- Net income: ₹27 crore (US$2.8 million) (2016–17)
- Owner: Ministry of Heavy Industries, Government of India
- Divisions: Engineering, Electrical, Tea
- Subsidiaries: Hooghly Printing
- Website: andrewyule.com

Andrew Yule & Co. Ltd. is an Indian central public sector undertaking under the ownership of the Ministry of Heavy Industries, Government of India. It is currently headquartered in Kolkata, and has offices in the main Indian cities. The majority of the products and services offered by the cpsu's subsidiaries are related to heavy industry and engineering.

== History ==
The business was founded by Andrew Yule in 1863 and incorporated as a private company in 1919. During the British Raj, the company was a large conglomerate. The company had varied and diversified business interests ranging from jute, cotton, coal, tea, engineering, electrical, power, chemicals, insurance, railways, shipping, paper, printing, apart from maintaining a zamindari and managing houses of several companies in India. The company was managed by Andrew Yule and his brother George Yule and later by David Yule. The Bengal Coal Co was part of the Andrew Yule group holding collieries in Bengal & Bihar. The company was turned into a public company in 1948, after India's independence from the British Empire. It became a central public sector enterprise (CPSE) (schedule B company) in 1979, after the Indian government completed a series of equity share acquisitions (49% in 1974 and 2% in 1979). As of 2011, the shareholders are the Indian government (97.46%), Financial Institutions (0.33%), and the remainder publicly traded (2.21%).

== Ownership ==
Andrew Yule & Co. is a central public sector undertaking under the ownership of Ministry of Heavy Industries.

=== Engineering division ===
The engineering division is located in Kalyani, West Bengal, and produces industrial fans and blowers, air pollution control equipment, water treatment plants, heavy machinery, and engineering turnkey contracts.

=== Electrical division ===
The electrical division produces power and distribution transformers, high voltage switching gear, low voltage control gear, flame-proof switch gear, voltage regulators and rectifiers, plant communication, fire alarm and detection systems. The switchgear and electrical systems group is located in Kolkata, while the transformer & switchgear unit is located in Chennai.

=== Tea division ===
The tea division comprises fifteen tea estates, listed below. Five of these are in West Bengal and ten in Assam.

- Mim Tea Estate in Darjeeling, West Bengal
- Four tea estates clustered together near Banarhat town in the Dooars region of Northern West Bengal
  - Karbala Tea Estate
  - Banarhat Tea Estate
  - Choonabhutti Tea Estate and
  - New Dooars Tea Estate
- Ten tea estates in Assam:
  - Khowang,
  - Bhamun,
  - Hingrijan,
  - Basmatia,
  - Desam,
  - Tinkong,
  - Rajgarh,
  - Hoolungoorie,
  - Murphulani and
  - Bogijan

=== Business development group ===
The business development group produces CAD & GIS applications, digitization, archiving, vectorization, and scanning of drawings, among other services.

== Subsidiaries ==
=== Tide Water Oil Co. (India) Ltd. ===
This division produces lubricants and greases under the Veedol brand. The CPSU currently owns 26.23% of Tide Water Oil Co. Ltd.

=== Descon Ltd. ===
Descon provided consultant services in the power and energy sector, engineering drawing, GIS, management consultancy, and software development. It started its operation in the mid of 90's. Initially, it was the stakeholder of DPSC or India Power. But after DPSC was taken over by SREI Group, Descon tied up with JSW Group. On 30 June 2014, Descon closed down its major operations as the company was suffering from huge losses for the last three years.

=== Webfil Ltd. ===
Webfil is a telecommunications provider, offering a digital micro radio telecommunication network, fibre-optic communication systems, multiplexers and message switching systems, and telecommunication network services. Additionally, it manufactures filaments for GLS lamps and cathodes for fluorescent Lamps.

=== Yule Financing & Leasing Co. ===
This CPSU provides loan syndication, capital restructuring, financial re-engineering, management of insurance for medium-sized capital business units, and corporate advisory services.

== Subsidiary companies ==
=== Hooghly Printing Co. Ltd. ===
This subsidiary provides multi-colour offset printing. It has regional offices in New Delhi, Mumbai and Chennai

== See also ==
- David Yule
