= Richard Armitage (government official) =

American diplomat and government official (1945–2025)

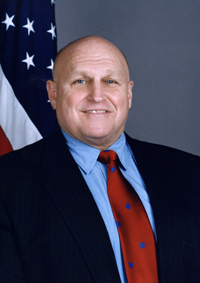
- Armitage in 2003

13th United States Deputy Secretary of State
- In office March 26, 2001 – February 23, 2005
- President: George W. Bush
- Secretary: Colin Powell; Condoleezza Rice
- Preceded by: Strobe Talbott
- Succeeded by: Robert Zoellick

Assistant Secretary of Defense for International Security Affairs
- In office April 2, 1983 – June 5, 1989 (Note: Acting: April 2, 1983 – June 5, 1983)
- President: Ronald Reagan; George H. W. Bush
- Preceded by: Bing West
- Succeeded by: Harry Rowen

Personal details
- Born: Richard Lee Armitage; April 26, 1945 Wellesley, Massachusetts, U.S.
- Died: April 13, 2025 (aged 79) Arlington County, Virginia, U.S.
- Party: Republican
- Spouse: Laura Samford
- Children: 8
- Relatives: Iain Armitage (grandson); Euan Morton (son-in-law)
- Education: U.S. Naval Academy (BS)

Military service
- Allegiance: United States
- Branch: United States Navy
- Service years: 1967–1973
- Rank: Lieutenant
- Battles/wars: Vietnam War

Richard Lee Armitage (April 26, 1945 – April 13, 2025) was an American diplomat and government official. A graduate of the United States Naval Academy, Armitage served as a U.S. Navy officer in three combat tours of duty in the Vietnam War as a riverine warfare advisor. After leaving active duty, he served in a number of civil-service roles under Republican administrations. He worked as an aide to Senator Bob Dole before serving in various posts in the Defense Department and State Department.

During the Reagan administration, Armitage was deputy assistant secretary of defense for East Asia and Pacific affairs (1981–1983) and assistant secretary of defense for International security affairs (1983–1989). He served in the George H. W. Bush administration in various diplomatic posts, including presidential special negotiator for the Philippines Military Bases Agreement, special mediator for water in the Middle East, special emissary to King Hussein of Jordan during the Gulf War, and director of U.S. aid to the post-Soviet states. He then worked in the private sector before joining the George W. Bush administration as deputy secretary of state, holding the post from March 2001 to February 2005.

Armitage's tenure at the State Department under Secretary Colin Powell became overshadowed by the Plame affair. Armitage acknowledged in 2006 that he leaked Valerie Plame Wilson's identity as a CIA operative to columnist Robert Novak, who revealed her identity in a July 2003 column; Armitage claimed that the leak was inadvertent, said that this was a "terrible error on my part," and issued an apology.

== Early life and military career ==
Armitage was born in Wellesley, Massachusetts, the son of Ruth H. and Leo Holmes Armitage. He grew up in Atlanta, and graduated from St. Pius X Catholic High School there in 1963. In 1967, he graduated from the United States Naval Academy.

He served on a destroyer stationed off the coast of Vietnam during the Vietnam War before volunteering to serve what would eventually become three combat tours with the riverine/advisory forces for the Republic of Vietnam Navy (RVNN). According to Captain Kiem Do, an RVNN officer who served with him in Vietnam, Armitage "seemed drawn like a moth to flame to the hotspots of the naval war: bedding down on the ground with Vietnamese commandos, sharing their rations and hot sauce, telling jokes in flawless Vietnamese". Instead of a Naval uniform, Armitage often dressed in native garb. He adopted a Vietnamese pseudonym, "Tran Phu", which loosely translated meant "rich Navy guy".

Several associates who fought alongside Armitage and other politicians (including Ted Shackley) have since claimed that Armitage was associated with the CIA's clandestine Phoenix Program. Armitage denied a role in Phoenix and stated that at most, CIA officers would occasionally ask him for intelligence reports.

In 1973, Armitage left active duty and joined the Defense Attaché Office, Saigon. Immediately prior to the fall of Saigon, he organized and led the removal of RVNN ships and personnel from the country and out of the hands of the approaching North Vietnamese. Armitage told RVNN officers to take their ships to a designated place in the ocean where they would be rescued by U.S. forces and their ships destroyed. When Armitage arrived at the designated location, he found 30 RVNN ships and dozens of fishing boats and cargo ships with as many as 30,000 Vietnamese refugees. With transportation options limited for removing the floating city, Armitage, aboard the destroyer escort USS Kirk, personally decided to lead the flotilla of ships over 1,000 miles (1,600 km) to shelter in Subic Bay, Philippines. This went against the wishes of both the Philippine and U.S. governments. Nevertheless, Armitage personally arranged for food and water to be delivered by the U.S. Defense Department before negotiating with both governments for permission to dock in Subic Bay.

Armitage was the recipient of several military decorations, including a Bronze Star with Combat V, Navy Commendation Medal with Combat V, and Navy Achievement Medal with Combat V.

== Public service career ==
Armitage served as an aide to Republican Senator Bob Dole. During the Ronald Reagan administration, he served from 1981 to 1983 as Deputy Assistant Secretary of State for International Security Affairs for East Asia and the Pacific and became Assistant Secretary of Defense for International Security Affairs on June 9, 1983, serving in that position for the next eight and a half years. Armitage was nominated by President George H. W. Bush in April 1989 to serve as Secretary of the Army under Defense Secretary Dick Cheney, but the nomination was withdrawn the following month at Armitage's request, who cited a desire to spend more time with his large family.

Working with NGOs like the Families of Vietnamese Political Prisoner Association, Armitage played a role in facilitating the emigration of thousands of families of former Republic of Vietnam military and civil officials to the United States.

During the Gulf War, Bush appointed Armitage as a special emissary to King Hussein of Jordan. From March 1992 to May 1993, Armitage was posted to Europe to lead U.S. foreign aid efforts to the newly independent post-Soviet states, and held the personal rank of ambassador.

After leaving the government, Armitage joined the private sector as director of U.S. data aggregation firm ChoicePoint.

== Christic Institute, Khun Sa, and misconduct allegations ==
In 1986, Armitage was named in an affidavit filed in a civil lawsuit by the Christic Institute as part of a conspiracy responsible for the La Penca bombing, and a number of other covert operations. The affidavit, by Christic's lead attorney Daniel Sheehan, alleged that Armitage was involved with heroin smuggling from southeast Asia to fund covert activities in South America. He and Ted Shackley were reported to be directly responsible for the Iran Contra Scandal.

Similar charges were made in a 1987 letter from the Burmese warlord Khun Sa to the U.S. Justice Department. The letter, which was transmitted by James "Bo" Gritz, accused Armitage of organizing heroin smuggling from the Golden Triangle in the 1960s and 70s. Upon returning to the United States with this information, a key witness, Lance Trimmer, was held by the CIA in Oklahoma for a period of time. He was released five minutes after the hearing ended in Las Vegas.

Armitage rebutted the charges from Sheehan and Khun Sa, observing that at dates he was said to be in Thailand, he was living in Washington D.C., working as an assistant to Senator Robert Dole.

In 1988, the United States District Court for the Southern District of Florida dismissed the Christic suit, after finding it to be frivolous and ordered the Institute to pay $955,000 in attorneys fees and $79,500 in court costs. The ruling was subsequently upheld by the United States Court of Appeals for the Eleventh Circuit and the Supreme Court of the United States.

In 1984, Armitage wrote a positive character reference using Pentagon stationary for Nguyet Thi O'Rourke, a Vietnamese immigrant convicted of running an illegal gambling operation in Virginia. Ross Perot, a political opponent of George H. W. Bush, alleged that Armitage had written this character reference to conceal an extramarital affair between the two. Armitage would later concede using Pentagon stationary was “dumb,” but denied doing anything illegal or improper.

== Bush administration ==
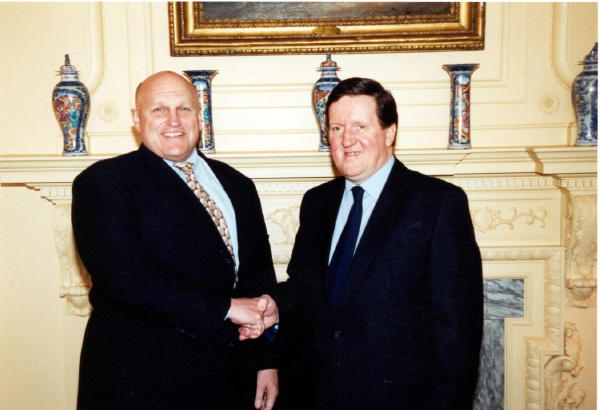
Deputy Secretary of State Richard Armitage and NATO Secretary General Lord Robertson meet in 2002.

In 1998, Armitage signed a letter to President Bill Clinton urging Clinton to target the removal of Saddam Hussein's regime from power in Iraq. It stated that Saddam's massive violations of the cease-fire that had ended the Gulf War has caused erosion of the Gulf War coalition's containment policy. It also raised the possibility that Iraq, emboldened by Western inaction, might re-develop weapons of mass destruction.

During the 2000 Presidential election campaign, he served as a foreign policy advisor to George W. Bush as part of a group led by Condoleezza Rice that called itself The Vulcans. The United States Senate confirmed him as deputy secretary of state on March 23, 2001; he was sworn in three days later. A close associate of Secretary of State Colin Powell, Armitage was regarded, along with Powell, as a moderate within the presidential administration of George W. Bush.

Armitage tendered his resignation on November 16, 2004 to accompany Powell, who announced his resignation as Secretary of State the day before. He left the post on February 22, 2005, when Robert Zoellick succeeded to the office.

== Role in Plame affair ==
The Plame affair was a political scandal concerning the outing of Valerie Plame as a covert intelligence operative during the Bush administration in 2003. An American syndicated columnist and conservative pundit, Robert Novak, had learned of her employment by the CIA from Armitage, who was then working for the State Department, and Novak had publicly identified her as the source of a recommendation given to the President in the course of her duties. Plame had to resign from the CIA because her identity was no longer secret. A criminal investigation into the revelation produced no charges against Armitage, but several charges against Scooter Libby, an assistant to Vice President Dick Cheney, for lying to the investigators about the matter. Libby was convicted, but his jail sentence was ultimately commuted by Bush, and he was subsequently pardoned by President Donald Trump on April 13, 2018.

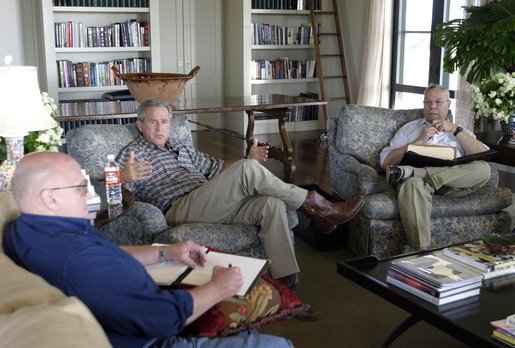
Armitage with President George W. Bush and Secretary of State Colin Powell, August 6, 2003

Armitage's defense that he had inadvertently made an off-hand remark during a probing interview with Novak, coupled with his candor and cooperation, was accepted, although the decision not to prosecute was not made until 2006. Meanwhile, the long and slow investigation played out in the press as a scandal, "the Plame Affair" or "Plamegate".

On November 15, 2005, journalist Bob Woodward of The Washington Post revealed in an article that "a government official with no axe to grind" leaked to him the identity of Valerie Plame in mid-June 2003. According to an April 2006 Vanity Fair article (published March 14, 2006), former Washington Post executive editor Ben Bradlee said in an interview "that Armitage is the likely source is a fair assumption", though Bradlee later told the Post that he "[did] not recall making that precise statement" in the interview. The following year, on March 2, 2006, bloggers discovered that "Richard Armitage" fit the spacing on a redacted court document, suggesting he was a source for the Plame leak. In August 2006, the Associated Press published a story that revealed Armitage met with Bob Woodward in mid-June 2003. The information came from official State Department calendars provided to the Associated Press under the Freedom of Information Act.

Novak, in an August 27, 2006 appearance on Meet the Press, stated that although he still would not release the name of his source, he felt it was long overdue that the source reveal himself. He had reason to think that the source might do that. Armitage had reportedly been a cooperative and key witness in the investigation. According to The Washington Note, Armitage had testified before the grand jury three times.

Press reports continued to mount and pressure to build. On August 29, 2006, Neil A. Lewis of The New York Times reported that Armitage was the "initial and primary source" for Novak's July 14, 2003 article, which named Plame as a CIA "operative" and which triggered the CIA leak investigation. On August 30, 2006, CNN reported that Armitage had been confirmed "by sources" as leaking Wilson's CIA role in a "casual conversation" with Novak. The New York Times, quoting "people familiar with his actions", reported that Armitage was unaware of Wilson's undercover status when he spoke to Novak. In the September 4, 2006 issue of Newsweek magazine, in an article titled "The Man Who Said Too Much", journalist Michael Isikoff, quoting a source "directly familiar with the conversation who asked not to be identified because of legal sensitivities", reported that Armitage was the "primary" source for Novak's piece outing Plame. Armitage allegedly mentioned Wilson's CIA role to Novak in a July 8, 2003 interview after learning about her status from a State Department memo which made no reference to her undercover status. Isikoff also reported that Armitage had also told Woodward of Plame's identity in June 2003, and that special counsel Patrick Fitzgerald investigated Armitage's role "aggressively", but did not charge Armitage with a crime because he "found no evidence that Armitage knew of Plame's covert CIA status when he talked to Novak and Woodward".

On September 7, 2006, Armitage admitted to being the source in the CIA leak. Armitage claims that Fitzgerald had originally asked him not to discuss publicly his role in the matter, but that on September 5 Armitage asked Fitzgerald if he could reveal his role to the public, and Fitzgerald consented. The Times claims that White House Counsel Alberto Gonzales was informed that Armitage was involved on October 2, 2003, but asked not to be told details. Fitzgerald began his grand jury investigation three months later knowing Armitage was a leaker (as did then U.S Attorney General John Ashcroft before turning over the investigation).

On March 6, 2007, a jury convicted Lewis "Scooter" Libby, Chief of Staff to Vice President Dick Cheney, of "obstruction of justice, giving false statements to the FBI and perjuring himself, charges embodied in four of the five counts of the indictment". On July 2, 2007, President Bush issued a grant of executive clemency that commuted the prison term imposed on Libby. In a review of Hubris: The Inside Story of Spin, Scandal, and the Selling of the Iraq War, by Michael Isikoff and David Corn, which hit bookstores in early September 2006, Novak wrote: "I don't know precisely how Isikoff flushed out Armitage [as Novak's original source], but Hubris clearly points to two sources: Washington lobbyist Kenneth Duberstein, Armitage's political adviser, and William Taft IV, who was the State Department legal adviser when Armitage was deputy secretary".

== Pakistan and the fight against terrorism ==
Pakistani President Pervez Musharraf, in an interview with CBS News 60 Minutes on September 21, 2006, alleged that Armitage called an Inter-Services Intelligence general immediately after the September 11, 2001 attacks and threatened to "bomb the country [Pakistan] back to the Stone Age" unless they supported the U.S.-led fight against Islamic terrorism. Musharraf refused to provide details due to restrictions by the publisher (Simon & Schuster) of his book In the Line of Fire: A Memoir. Bush, on the other hand, had mentioned that he only became aware of these comments as late as September 2006, when he read them in the newspapers. Armitage confirmed he had held a conversation with the Pakistani general to whom Musharraf had sourced the comments, but stated he had not used a threat of military action couched in such terms, as he was not authorized to do so.

== Life after government service ==
After leaving office, Armitage founded a global business advisory firm, Armitage International, LC.

In October 2006, Armitage lobbied—on behalf of the L-3 Communications Corporation, a company providing intelligence, surveillance, and reconnaissance products—some key people in Taiwanese political circles regarding the possible sale of P-3C marine patrol aircraft to the ROC military. Those who received his personal letter included Premier Su Tseng-chang, President of the Legislative Yuan Wang Jin-pyng, and opposition People First Party leader James Soong.

Armitage stated in the letter that he wished the Taiwan government would reconsider the purchase from Lockheed Martin, the dealer the United States government had designated. Instead, he hoped that the right to negotiate the purchase should be made through an open and fair bidding process. The letter was made public by PFP Legislators on October 24, 2006, in a Legislative Yuan session discussing the military purchases.

In a 2009 interview, Armitage said that waterboarding, a tactic used by the CIA during the Bush administration on suspected terrorists in 2002 and 2003, was torture, but that he did not believe CIA officials should be prosecuted for ordering its use. Armitage said that he did not know about the CIA torture program while he was Deputy Secretary of State, and that "I hope, had I known about it at the time I was serving, I would've had the courage to resign."

Armitage served on a number of boards for corporations and nonprofits. Since January 1, 2010, Armitage was a member of the board of directors and chairman of the American-Turkish Council, a Washington-based association dedicated to the promotion of business, military, and foreign policy relationship between Turkey and the United States. Armitage was a member of the America Abroad Media advisory board until 2014, and the board of ConocoPhillips until May 2018. He also was the chairman of the Project 2049 Institute until January 2020.

In the 2016 presidential election, Armitage was one of many Republicans who endorsed Democratic nominee Hillary Clinton and opposed Republican Donald Trump.

In 2020, Armitage, along with over 130 other former Republican national security officials, signed a statement that asserted that Trump was unfit to serve another term, and "To that end, we are firmly convinced that it is in the best interest of our nation that Vice President Joe Biden be elected as the next President of the United States, and we will vote for him."

== Personal life and death ==
Armitage and his wife Laura Samford Armitage had eight children. He was fluent in Vietnamese and well versed in many other languages. He was an avid powerlifter and loved to play basketball. He was also a football linebacker at the United States Naval Academy and teammate of Roger Staubach. He graduated in 1967. His grandson is actor Iain Armitage, son of Richard's daughter Lee.

Armitage died of a pulmonary embolism at a hospital in Arlington, Virginia, on April 13, 2025, at the age of 79. He was survived by his wife and eight children.

== Honors and awards ==
Country	Date	Appointment	Ribbon	Post-nominal letters	Notes
United Kingdom	December 15, 2005	Honorary Knight Commander of the Order of St Michael and St George		KCMG	
Australia	July 1, 2010	Honorary Companion of the Order of Australia		AC	The citation for the honor reads as follows: "for eminent service to strengthening the Australia–United States bilateral relationship"
New Zealand	June 6, 2011	Honorary Companion of the New Zealand Order of Merit		CNZM	In recognition of his services to New Zealand–U.S. relations
Japan	November 5, 2015	Grand Cordon of the Order of the Rising Sun			
Romania		Commander of the Order of the Star of Romania			
United States		The Presidential Citizens Medal			
United States		Secretary of State’s Distinguished Service Award			
United States		Department of State Distinguished Honor Award			
United States		Department of Defense Medal for Distinguished Public Service			with three stars (four awards)
United States		Secretary of Defense Medal for Outstanding Public Service			
United States		Chairman of the Joint Chiefs Award for Outstanding Public Service			

Armitage received the Distinguished Alumni Award from the U.S. Naval Academy in 2013.

Armitage received an Honorary Doctorate from Keio University in 2017. The program is the Richard Lee Armitage Commemorative Program: Building New Foundations for the Robust Japan-United States Relationship.

== Notes ==
Political offices
Preceded by Bing West	Assistant Secretary of Defense for International Security Affairs; 1981–1985	Succeeded by Harry Rowen
Preceded by Strobe Talbott	United States Deputy Secretary of State; 2001–2005	Succeeded by Robert Zoellick
