= CIA activities in Vietnam =

The Central Intelligence Agency (CIA) conducted operations in Vietnam from the 1950s to the mid 1970s, before and during the Vietnam War. After the 1954 Geneva Conference, North Vietnam was controlled by communist forces under Ho Chi Minh's leadership. South Vietnam, with the assistance of the U.S., was anti-communist under Ngo Dinh Diem's leadership. The economic and military aid supplied by the U.S. to South Vietnam continued until 1975. The CIA participated in both the political and military aspect of the wars in Indochina. The CIA provided suggestions for political platforms, supported candidates, and instituted the Phoenix Program. It also worked with the ethnic minority Montagnards, Hmong, and Khmer. There are 174 National Intelligence Estimates dealing with Vietnam, issued by the CIA after coordination with the U.S. intelligence community.

== Vietnam 1945–1947 ==
From 1887 to 1945, Vietnam was part of French Indochina, along with Cambodia and Laos. During World War II, the Imperial Japanese Army occupied Indochina and remained there until 1945, when the Axis powers were defeated. French Indochina in World War II underwent significant political changes, and nationalist sentiment intensified. Meanwhile, the Viet Minh forces conducted some guerrilla activities against the Japanese, but on too small a scale to have played any role in Japan's defeat.

In 1945, the U.S. OSS provided the communist-led Viet Minh with training and weapons to develop local intelligence networks against the Japanese. The Viet Minh downplayed its communist core, outsmarting the OSS, to conceal Ho Chi Minh's ties to international communism while suggesting that the new Vietnamese government wanted to maintain connections with the United States, France, and other Western countries, although in reality, he had no such intention and sought an alliance with the Soviet Union.

Following World War II, France began to reoccupy Indochina and reassert its former dominance. Much of this can be traced back to a desire to restore French glory and national pride after the humiliation the nation suffered during the course of the war. The French also wished to reclaim Indochina to regain control over its valuable rubber plantations, mostly in northeastern Cochinchina (the area north of Saigon) and eastern Cambodia.

== Vietnam 1950–1954 ==
The US recognized the anticommunist State of Vietnam in February 1950. CIA officers then moved to French Indochina as a part of the legation of the United States in the city of Saigon. After their arrival, CIA involvement expanded to a new large base in Hanoi. The CIA's activities in Vietnam did not grow any further due to the French discouraging CIA activity (the French were still clinging to the idea that they could one day still dominate Vietnam and the U.S. was against this course of action).

The CIA held classified documents which detail the threat of the Viet Cong or the Vietnamese Communists against the French. The CIA feared the loss of control of Vietnam. They wished for the French to remain in power. The six-page document from 1950, explains the position of the Central Intelligence Agency on Indochina. While the Viet Cong was trying to expel France from power in Vietnam, there was also a fear that there would be an intervention from the Chinese Communists. Regardless of this, the CIA knew that losing Vietnam to Communism would place the rest of Southeast Asia at risk.

CIA involvement in Vietnam was discouraged by the French because it was found that the CIA would often bypass them to open channels to Vietnamese nationalists. CIA activity expanded when the Indochina region became three separate states and grew exponentially during the French War in 1953 to 1954 when France was essentially forced to accept American assistance with unconventional warfare activities.

Despite this resilience by the French, CIA intelligence perceived a deteriorating situation in Vietnam. A 1950 CIA intelligence report noted that the threat of Communism in Indochina was rising as rebel attacks on French outposts continued and highlighted the weaknesses of the French. An intelligence report on Indochinese military developments revealed how vulnerable the French military was, due to the fall of the French border holding at Dong Khe, as well as some attacks they had suffered in Tonkin. The report doubted France's ability to hold Indochina much longer if the Viet Minh continued to attack. The authors of the report feared that, "if these attacks [were to] develop into a coordinated, a large-scale Viet Minh offensive, an action which [might] soon be within Viet Minh capabilities, French maintenance of control over Indochina – by means of their own forces alone – [would] be seriously threatened." This document also noted French hesitancy to bolster the Viet Minh, "apparently fearing that such a step would weaken their ability to contain Vietnamese nationalism."

U.S. intelligence community notes how cautious the French were in arming a Vietnamese army. The report further claimed that "French reluctance to expand or strengthen the Vietnamese National Army is indicated by insistence on allocation and distribution of U.S. military aid under French control, failure to make plans for necessary financing, inability of French officials to agree on a course of action or policy, and refusal to expand the local militia." Additionally, the French officially refused to accept help from the U.S. in the form of training Vietnamese troops by U.S. military instructors. There is a suggestion at the end of the report that the French would need to accept American aid to train the Vietnamese army and to supply them, if they wanted to change their policy of arming the Vietnamese.

During 1953–1954, the involvement of the CIA increased when the French finally accepted U.S. assistance with the unconventional (guerrilla) warfare tactics they faced, as the French were facing large and costly losses at the hands of what would become the Viet Cong and the North Vietnamese forces. The primary aid initially offered by the U.S. was military aid in supplying military hardware and training of the Vietnamese army; the scope of U.S. aid to the French was greatly expanded during and after the Eisenhower administration. Without aid from the United States, there would be little practical effect from this ostensible change in French policy.

There was a reestablishment of a covert action section in Saigon Station. There was also unilateral covert action which was suspended in 1953 under State Department pressure. This was due to the French exposing paramilitary operations against the Vietminh in Ha Noi that the agency did not previously clear with them.

The CIA's mission in Saigon was to directly assess the nationalist politicians. The primary cause and motivation behind the intervention of the U.S. and CIA through 1954 was to gather intelligence and provide interpretations of the events that occurred in Indochina through an American perspective. Outside of North Vietnam, the agency's broad span of activities reached into almost every aspect of the Indochina war. The agency conducted several paramilitary programs and conducted a full-scale war in Laos and South Vietnam.

Following the French defeat at Dien Bien Phu in May 1954, the United States anticipated the expansion of Communism in Vietnam and Southeast Asia as a whole, if they should sit aloof and keep to the French resilience of not needing their support. The CIA became convinced that without any action the southern part of Vietnam would fall to the communist control just as the North had been captured by the communist forces. The CIA without the approval of the State, supported Diem to step up a strong foothold in the Vietnamese region in the same year. The CIA's support for Diem could be traced to 1952, through an established relationship with his brother, Ngo Dinh Nhu. The move by the CIA was purposely aimed to wean the southern part from the Communist-controlled north through the 17th parallel. In order to prevent the North Communist military from gaining control over the entire Vietnamese region, the CIA and Diem's Special Forces established the rural self-defense units to mark the beginning of American counterinsurgency efforts in Vietnam. For the immediate nine years, the CIA will continue to work closely with Ngo Dinh Nhu to aid Diem in establishing national political institutions in South Vietnam.

== Vietnam 1954 ==
In 1954, the CIA would remain consistent in its activities in Vietnam. The CIA's expansion included various stations throughout Vietnam and Laos. A station was also located in Cambodia, but relations with that country were broken off in 1963 and reinstated only during the 1970s. The CIA stations, though initially used solely for gathering intelligence and providing interpretations of events in Indochina, came to gain as much importance as the U.S. embassy in its scale of political relations with the South Vietnamese government due to its broad range of activities. The CIA stations in Vietnam were also responsible for conducting a full-scale war in Laos at that time in addition to South Vietnam paramilitary operations.

In 1961, the U.S. government entrusted the CIA with irregular operations in Laos with the intent of negotiated settlement. In Vietnam, U.S. Army Special Forces teams were engaged in tribal programs similar to the one with Vang Pao. However, the CIA was in operation control because any deployment of Vietnam-based units to or across the Laotian border would be clandestine. The CIA was instructed by Washington to make decisions and which indigenous elements would participate.

Another key event that occurred in 1954 was the creation of the Geneva Accords. Signed by France, Great Britain, the Soviet Union, China, and three Associated States of Indochina including Ho Chi Minh's Democratic Republic of Vietnam, the Accords addressed the issue of what to do with Vietnam since the Viet Minh had ended colonial rule in the north. Although the United States had agreed to respect the Accords, it would not sign them because the U.S. government disagreed with the provision that split Vietnam at the 17th parallel. These Accords would come to play a major role in the United States' decision to interfere with the situation in Vietnam. The U.S. government had provided the French with logistical support in their mission to defeat the Viet Minh. It was only a matter of time, however, before the French needed military support as well. Essentially, the Geneva Accords forced the United States to decide if it was willing to provide such assistance. As historian Thomas L. Ahern Jr stated, "In the end, the importance of halting Communism overshadowed the risks, and the United States embarked on its 21-year effort to create in South Vietnam a permanent barrier to Communist expansion in Southeast Asia."

=== Covert action ===
The new CIA team in Saigon was the Saigon Military Mission, headed by United States Air Force Colonel Edward Lansdale, who arrived on June 1, 1954. His diplomatic cover title was Assistant Air Attaché. The broad mission for the team was to undertake paramilitary operations against the enemy and to train the ARVN in the arts of psychological warfare, just like Lansdale had done in an earlier conflict in the Philippines. Although Lansdale worked for the OSS briefly in World War II, he was never a CIA employee.

Working in close cooperation with the U.S. Information Agency, a new psychological warfare campaign was devised for the Vietnamese Army and for the government in Hanoi. Shortly after, a refresher course in combat psy-war was constructed.

One example of psychological warfare dealt directly with misinformation. Lansdale would later recall the event in his memoirs: "The first idea was used just before the French quit the city of Hanoi and turned over control to the Viet Minh. At the time, the Communist apparatus inside the city was busy with secret plans to ready the population to welcome the entry of Viet Minh troops. I suggested that my nationalist friends issue a fake Community manifesto, ordering everyone in the city except essential hospital employees to be out on the streets not just for a few hours of welcome but for a week-long celebration. In actuality this would mean a seven-day work stoppage. Transportation, electric power, and communication services would be suspended. The simple enlargement of plans already afoot should give the communists an unexpectedly vexing problem as they started their rule." The celebration did not last a week. The Communists thought that this manifesto was French counterpropaganda and attempted to order everyone back to work, which took three days.

The second SMM member, Major Lucien Conein, arrived on July 1. A paramilitary specialist, well known to the French for his help with French-operated maquis in Tonkin against the Japanese in 1945, he was the one American guerrilla fighter who had not been a member of the Patti Mission. In August, he went to Hanoi with the assignment of developing a paramilitary organization in the north.... A second paramilitary team for the south was formed, with Army Lieutenant Edward Williams doing double duty as the only experienced counter-espionage officer, working with revolutionary political groups.

=== Intelligence analysis ===
Working with available data, the CIA produced a National Intelligence Estimate in August 1954. It began by stating that the Communist signing of the Geneva agreements had legitimized them, and they would need to immediately move to control the North while planning for long-term control of the country. It went on to say that the Viet Minh "will probably emphasize social and economic reforms and the participation of all political, economic, and religious groups in state activity."

This National Intelligence Estimate went on to suggest that while the Diem government was in official control of the South, it remained unpopular because of a disconnect of the government from the people. Certain pro-French elements may have been planning to overthrow it. CIA experts also noted that Diem would have political issues on top of already sinking popularity. Viet Minh elements would remain in the South and create an underground resistance force, discredit the government, and undermine French-Vietnamese relations.

On October 26, 1954, Lansdale lured two key personnel in a planned coup against South Vietnamese President Ngo Dinh Diem out of the country. Lansdale invited Hinh and staff to visit the Philippines.

U.S. personnel dealing with the Government of Vietnam had difficulties understanding Vietnamese politics. This can be attributed to the fact that the CIA did not make a concerted effort to gain a better understanding of the history and culture of Vietnam. The CIA instead focused on the military forces occupying the territory instead of the political and economic forces that motivated them. The diplomats were not getting clear information in 1954 and early 1955, but the CIA station "had ... no mandate or mission to perform systematic intelligence and espionage in friendly countries, and so lacks the resources to gather and evaluate the large amounts of information required on political forces, corruption, connections, and so on."

In Thomas Ahern's monograph, he stops short of saying that the agency was an actor in the coup that overthrew South Vietnamese leader Ngo Dinh Diem. Within the monograph it is noted that on the morning of the coup the U.S. Military Command in Vietnam (MACV) advised the CIA that Saigon was quiet, and that the CIA should stop reporting a coup was imminent or in progress. The CIA also reportedly recognized that Diem would have political issues as early as August 1954. It is reported that policy surrounding Diem was set with this in mind. Relations with Diem's brother, Ngo Dinh Nhu, began as early as 1952, also signaling that the CIA predicted issues with Diem. Despite having the benefit of expert warnings, it is clear that the CIA acted beyond the scope of its experts.

== Vietnam 1955 ==
By 31 January 1955, a paramilitary group had cached its supplies in Haiphong, having had them shipped by Civil Air Transport, a CIA proprietary airline belonging to the Directorate of Support.

Ngo Dinh Diem and Ngo Dinh Nhu had been exploited by the help of CIA advisors to help defeat one of the challenges to the new Prime Minister's authority.

Lansdale and the South Vietnamese leader Ngo Dinh Diem had been working together; however, they did not agree on the government system they wanted in South Vietnam. In August 1955, Lansdale brought Juan Orendain, a Filipino constitutional scholar, to Saigon in order to sway Diem in a direction similar to the American system. Lansdale was hoping he could have the same effect on Diem as he had previously when working with Magsaysay in the Philippines. Part of this meant proposing a legislature and a judicial system to signal that Diem was open to checks and balances and was not trying to be beyond reproach in his position. By April 1956 Diem had considered and rejected the model proposed by Orendain and was more concerned about the broad authority he needed that very moment. All the while Lansdale had little to no real oversight from the rest of the CIA as these actions were taking place. Though he took advantage of this autonomy to improvise, it also meant he had little to no backup to enforce or further persuade Diem into a governmental separation of powers.

During one encounter in early 1955, Diem rejected U.S. ambassadorial representative J. Lawton Collins's nominee for commander of the Army of Republic of Vietnam. Collins wanted competence, whereas Diem preferred someone loyal.

On April 27, 1955, the Battle of Saigon had begun. The private crime syndicate Binh Xuyen and the Vietnamese National Army would wage conflict for around a month in Cholon. The Binh Xuyen had been influential (as a powerful Saigon gang) in post-colonial Vietnam, and had even stolen arms and fought the French, however they were defeated quickly. Diem had issued the Binh Xuyen an ultimatum to come under control or be eliminated. The damage caused by the fighting resulted in around a thousand casualties, and tens of thousands more homeless.

In January 1956 Diem promulgated Ordinance 6, which authorized detention and reeducation for anyone considered a danger to the state. This led to a problem of overcrowding as there were already 20,000 alleged communists that had been placed in detention camps since 1954, according to Diem's Information Ministry. Lansdale claimed that there were 7,000 political detainees in Saigon's Chi Hoa prison alone.

Operation Brotherhood, created by Ramon Magsaysay in the Philippines, had its first medical team beginning in late 1954. By 1955, it had more than 100 doctors and nurses at 10 medical center locations in South Vietnam to treat refugees and to train Vietnamese medical personnel. The second pacification operation was launched late April 1955 in the southern Dinh Dinh and northern Phu Yen portion of Central Vietnam.

== Vietnam 1959 ==
North Vietnamese troops needed a way to link themselves with their allies in Southern Vietnam. The Viet Cong and North Vietnamese soldiers were able to supply troops and military operations through secret tunnels and the Ho Chi Minh trail. The Ho Chi Minh trail was an interlocking trail system that was created through the borders of Laos and Cambodia that reach from North Vietnam to South Vietnam. During the construction of this trail, native guides had to be used to guide the North Vietnamese troops through the wild countryside. Campsites that were built along the side of the trail grew into way points for troops to gather and rest. The trail stretched 800 miles and could take up to three months to travel by foot. Laos had been demilitarized during the 1960s. The North Vietnamese however did not respect the Laos treaty with the U.S., Instead, the North Vietnamese disregarded the peace treaty and begun their construction of the trail to aid their southern Vietnamese allies. Pictures revealing the trail's construction were taken by Vietnamese journalists. However, some of the greatest dangers were not the humans following the trail but rather the mother nature one would encounter along the way. Guides were needed for groups to navigate the dangerous trail. Snakes and spiders would flood the clothing of travelers along with dangerous terrain. For these reasons, travelers needed to practice great precaution along the way. The trail quickly became one of the secret forces of the war. Once United States officials gathered intelligence about the trail, they quickly installed motion sensors across the trail to catch insurgents. The complexity of the trail grew further during the 1960s.

Detecting Viet Cong movements on the Ho Chi Minh trail was exceedingly difficult. The trail was a complex collection of interconnecting footpaths. The flexibility afforded by its complexity meant multiple routes could be traversed from north to south. As such, it was easy to shift to a different route if the security of one area was compromised. Furthermore, the length of the trail and the small number of persons using it on any given segment, coupled with its flexible nature made detection all but impossible.

In attempts to combat troop and supply movement along the trail, the CIA and U.S. military set up heat and movement sensors along the trail to track enemy movement. U.S. forces also attempted to use air dropped listening devices to track enemy troops and pinpoint Viet Cong movements.

1959 also saw the arrival of William Colby in the region, and it became increasingly noticeable throughout 1959 that Diem was becoming paranoid regarding security issues and the military. This time saw a constant back and forth between Diem and Nhu over control of the military in the region. The year 1959 saw Diem's authority quickly being lessened, as Tran Quoc Bhu had insisted upon it.

The CIA had very few contacts in the Viet Cong ranks or North Vietnam at the time. Many of the contacts that they had were double agents run by the Viet Cong. Much of the intelligence gathered regarding North Vietnam was unreliable. U.S. and South Vietnamese military personnel believed that the bulk of North Vietnamese supplies were being shipped over the Ho Chi Minh trail, however, more than 80 percent of Northern supplies were sent by sea.

U.S. Special Forces also began to train some Laotian soldiers in unconventional warfare techniques as early as the fall of 1959 under the code name Erawan. This was because after President Kennedy took power who refused to send more American soldiers to battle in Southeast Asia. Instead, he called upon the CIA to use its "tribal forces" in Laos and to "make every possible effort to launch guerrilla operations in North Vietnam with its Asian recruits." Hence, under this code name, General Vang Pao, who served the royal Lao family was recruited. He then recruited and trained his Hmong soldiers to ally with the CIA and fight against the communist North.

== Vietnam 1961 ==
In April 1961, Lansdale, who had been designated the Operations Officer for an interagency Task Force in charge of political, military, economic, psychological, and covert character, was to go to Vietnam. Changes of policy in Washington however, transferred these responsibilities to the military and diplomats, and Lansdale was no longer involved with Vietnam.

On May 11, 1961, President Kennedy gave the authorization to begin "a program for covert actions to be carried out by the Central Intelligence Agency which would precede and remain in force after any commitment of U.S. forces to South Vietnam." Kennedy was giving the CIA the job of preparing for the eventual landing of U.S. troops. Later that year, in October 1961 the Director of Central Intelligence Allen Dulles approved a massive counterinsurgency program with the goal of launching a "village defense program in the lightly populated but strategically important Central Highlands." The involvement of the CIA rose substantially when they were given the task of supporting "irregular formations" that did not fall under other agencies' jurisdictions, which include civil wars, guerrilla wars, and rebellions. They were given this job because of an interagency task force recommendation in January 1962. Later that year in May 1962, Defense Secretary McNamara promised the Far East Division chief Desmond FitzGerald "a blank check...in terms of men, money, and material." This illustrates the important mission given to the CIA by the Department of Defense and the White House.

CIA begins to sponsor and train the Civilian Irregular Defense Groups (CIDG) in the South-Central Highlands. These were local defense operations with a mobile support component, "Mike Force", made up primarily of Nung mercenaries. Most CIDG units eventually became Vietnamese Rangers. These forces were intended to help combat the guerrilla tactics of the Vietcong.The CIDG grew out of a Military Operations Section (MOS) program led by Gilbert Layton. Layton's priority was strengthening the intelligence network in the country, specifically in the border regions with Cambodia and Laos. Layton sought to find locals that could gather intelligence on Viet Cong installations in the area. He proposed a program "designed to recruit as many as 1,000 tribesmen to operate in the guerrilla-infested high plateau areas bordering on northern Cambodia and South Laos." His proposal for a crop station and seed distribution was approved but it suffered many delays and problems. CIA Deputy Chief William Colby expanded the intelligence gathering operation into a defense building operation known as the "Montagnard defense program."

In 1961, the CIA also strengthened contact with then-captain in the Royal Laotian Armed Forces, Vang Pao. Pao was a member of the nomadic Hmong tribe, a southeast Asian ethnic minority dwelling primarily in the mountains of Laos, Thailand, and Vietnam, and the CIA quickly realized the potential use of the Hmong as guerrilla fighters against Laotian as well as North Vietnamese communist forces. First donations of food, blankets, and then by January 24, 1961, 300 Hmong received weapons to Vang Pao's troops, the CIA sent men to train Hmong fighters in guerrilla tactics, eventually engaging soon-to-be-General Pao's approximately 10,000 men. These Hmong forces would prove valuable to the CIA's tactics for the remainder of the war, despite insecurities on both sides as to the allegiance of the other. It was during 1961 that Vang Pao expressed concerns as to the dedication of the CIA in aiding and remaining supportive of the Hmong after their use in the Vietnam War.

Laos, in 1961, was more important than even the incoming president knew. Kennedy had organized a meeting with Eisenhower, who was on his way out of the Oval Office, to discuss the strategic importance of Laos. They discussed "keeping the 'cork in the bottle'...to prevent communist dominion over most of the Far East." Eisenhower saw Laos as so important, that he was worried about all of Thailand, Cambodia, and South Vietnam falling to communism if Laos went that way. The president was concerned that the Royal Laotian Army (RLA) was impotent and mutinous and did not want to rely on them. He was so concerned, that in this meeting, he said he would "as a last desperate hope...intervene unilaterally," if it were up to him. The interventions, as mentioned in the paragraph above, ended up being the arming and training of paramilitary forces. While preventing a communist Laos remained the objective of the CIA for the next 14 years, the focus of their paramilitary operations changed over time. Until 1964, the Hmong fighters in Laos focused on trying to fight back North Vietnamese fighters and on preventing further encroachment. They were highly important, because the U.S. hadn't begun putting troops on the ground in any great numbers, yet. After that, in 1965, the report describes the Hmong activities in Laos as "flitt[ing] over mountain trails or mov[ing] by air to occupy key high ground and to harass Hanoi's tanks and artillery," meaning that U.S. troops took on a frontline role and asked the paramilitary forces to operate in more difficult terrain and in less standard ways.

The Buon Enao Project

Buon Enao was a Rhadé village that was the location of a CIA experimental program designed to strengthen defenses against the Viet Cong. The CIA brought several proposals to the village elders, and almost all were met with protest or skepticism. After satisfying all of their concerns, the Americans were able to build a perimeter border fence as well as dispensary. They also armed the villages and trained them how to shoot. They were named the CIDG so that they did not give the appearance of a "covert offensive military unity." Buon Enao was the "first CIDG Area Development Center, which controlled social and economic development services as well as the village defense system in the surrounding area."

=== Tony Poe (Anthony Poshepny) ===
Tony Poe was recruited into the CIA after he graduated from San Jose State University and finished his training in 1953. Poe worked with the Hmong starting in March 1961. He was then transferred to Long Tieng. In Long Tieng Poe ran field missions with the Hmong partisans. After he took an enemy round in the stomach in January 1965, and one-too-many confrontations with Vang Pao, Poshepny was transferred up-country, to the land of Yao tribesmen. The tribesmen thought of him as "a drinker and an authoritarian commander and a mercurial leader, who could threaten and bribe to get his way" He died on June 27, 2003.

== Vietnam 1962 ==
In February 1962, two disgruntled South Vietnamese air force pilots bombed the presidential palace in hopes of killing Diem and forcing a new leadership, but their plan failed as he was in a different part of the palace when the attack happened. Diem reassigned military officers to improve his security, however, he still did not undertake political reforms. It was also agreed upon in 1962 to grow the Laotian irregulars despite potential diplomatic consequences.

In the Spring of 1962, the CIA became interested hitting at North Vietnam's navy; the agency called it Operation VULCAN. In order to fulfill this operation, the CIA hired "18 South Vietnamese who had been trained in underwater demolition" to target the port of Quảng Khê, which "was home to several of the DRV's Swatow-class gunboats". The CIA was able to get USS Catfish to do reconnaissance, and intelligence collection. the World War II era submarine confirmed that the Swatows were indeed at Quang Khe. Aerial Reconnaissance confirmed three Swatows each having "frogmen" attached to their demolition. In June 1962, the demolition crew, called the "frogmen", were carried by Nautilus III within swimming distance of the North Vietnamese port, at which point the divers swam to the various military ships in the port and attached their bombs. However, "how many of them detonated remained unclear, for one of them went off prematurely, with the swimmer already spotted and trying to escape". One frogman is believed to have been caught in the explosion of one gunboat and died. Nautilus III was chased down by a Swatow at which point the Swatow collided with Nautilus III, and all crew, except one, were captured by the North Vietnamese. The document concludes that the mission was considered successful and the military was prepared to continue such operations which often ended with the summary of "mission successful, price heavy".

The Geneva Agreements were proposed in order to end suspension of flights that went through the Laotian airspace. The agreement went into place in October 1962. Later, the CIA grew afraid that they might demoralize their liaison partners so they did not disclose information pertaining to the policy basis that halted some operations. TARZAN was developed in order to monitor the North Vietnamese road traffic and then the findings would be taken back to the CIA. They were a sabotage team that was released near Route 2. On December 30, a sabotage team that was sponsored by SEPES was called LYRE. This was a part of the nine teams developed that often did not go into full effect.

== Vietnam 1963 ==
The U.S. supported Diem in hopes to create a nation that was south of the demilitarized zone at the 17th parallel. In July 1963, the CIA expressed worry about Diem's treatment of Buddhists, and thought correctly that the more immediate threat was a non-communist coup. In the same report, it also mentions that initially, a post-Diem government would be less effective. In August 1963, South Vietnamese military officers initially planned to obtain support from the U.S. for their coup against Ngo Dinh Diem. State Department official Roger Hilsman originated a cable giving the South Vietnamese generals the green light for a coup against Diem and in October 1963 final plans were made for the coup that was carried out. On November 1, 1963, the House of Ngo ended when generals working for President Diem surrounded the Palace. The Palace was surrounded by units that were brought into Saigon from Mekong Delta and Bien Hoa. Observers of the firefight got close enough to count about 200 rebel troops and there was a report of 35 armored vehicles heading toward the palace. With Diem loyalists being detained, political arrangements were of order and they acknowledged that the new government would be a civilian one. Minh threatened Diem in every way, exerting that he had no patience and would "blast him off the face of the earth" if he did not surrender. After a bombardment of artillery fire to intimidate Diem, Minh ordered an assault on the palace. The next morning Diem finally called the JGC Headquarters promising to surrender if he had safe passage out of the country. Americans had ordered that the Diem and Nhu were kept safe but an officer of Minh had placed them into an armored vehicle and shot them to death. The Americans began to focus on fixing the makeup of the coup rather than the policy of the successor's government after they had realized how bad Diem was as a leader. The CIA paid $42,000 in immediate support money to the plotters the morning the coup, given by Lucien Connie an act of prefigured in administration planning.

On July 8, 1963, A CIA officer was told by Major General Tran Van Don (South Vietnam's army commander) that there were plans by the military to overthrow President Diem. A document created by Thomas L. Ahern, reveals the agency's plans to send reconnaissance/sabotage teams and solitary agents into the Democratic Republic of Vietnam. The history of the CIA reveals that the Diem government and its intelligence services made numerous assurances to work together but did little to move the program forward for months or years, which contributed significantly to the slow start of penetration missions. One such instance is when Diem, claiming to have been successful in establishing false agent networks in North Vietnam, leased a seagoing junk that the CIA had acquired and adapted for espionage operations to a Japanese fishing company. The United States' assistance of the South Vietnamese police together with agreements on intelligence cooperation with the CIA in 1959 produced no data at all. The first long-term operative placed in the North initially sent his handlers a total of twenty-three signals once the CIA started organizing its own missions. This constituted "the longest and most prolific radio correspondence for any penetration of the program". The history of the CIA shows that despite hundreds of commandos being dispatched into North Vietnam and dozens of follow-up missions, virtually little intelligence was obtained. The investigation details many instances in which various parties questioned the loyalty or dependability of commando teams while the CIA's Saigon station consistently ignored the data to insist the operation was still valuable. This served as a preview to the United States' adoption of OPLAN 34-A, an attempt to exert force on North Vietnam, at the beginning of 1964.

In November 1963, the CIA, or "the Station", was relied upon by Vietnamese generals, who had recently staged a coup, to aid in the set up of a new regime. The Station was coming out of a U.S. Mission moratorium on contacts with the new leadership imposed by Ambassador Henry Cabot Lodge. A White House tape of President Kennedy and his advisers confirms that top U.S. officials sought the November 1, 1963 coup against South Vietnamese leader Ngo Dinh Diem without apparently considering the consequences for Diem personally. With support of the coup coming from the U.S. it would have the potential of making us responsible for the outcome in South Vietnam. The U.S. didn't support the generals in the creation of the new constitutional government because the U.S. didn't want to seem involved. This decision precipitated in successive governments that lacked legitimacy and effective beaucracy.

== Vietnam 1964 ==
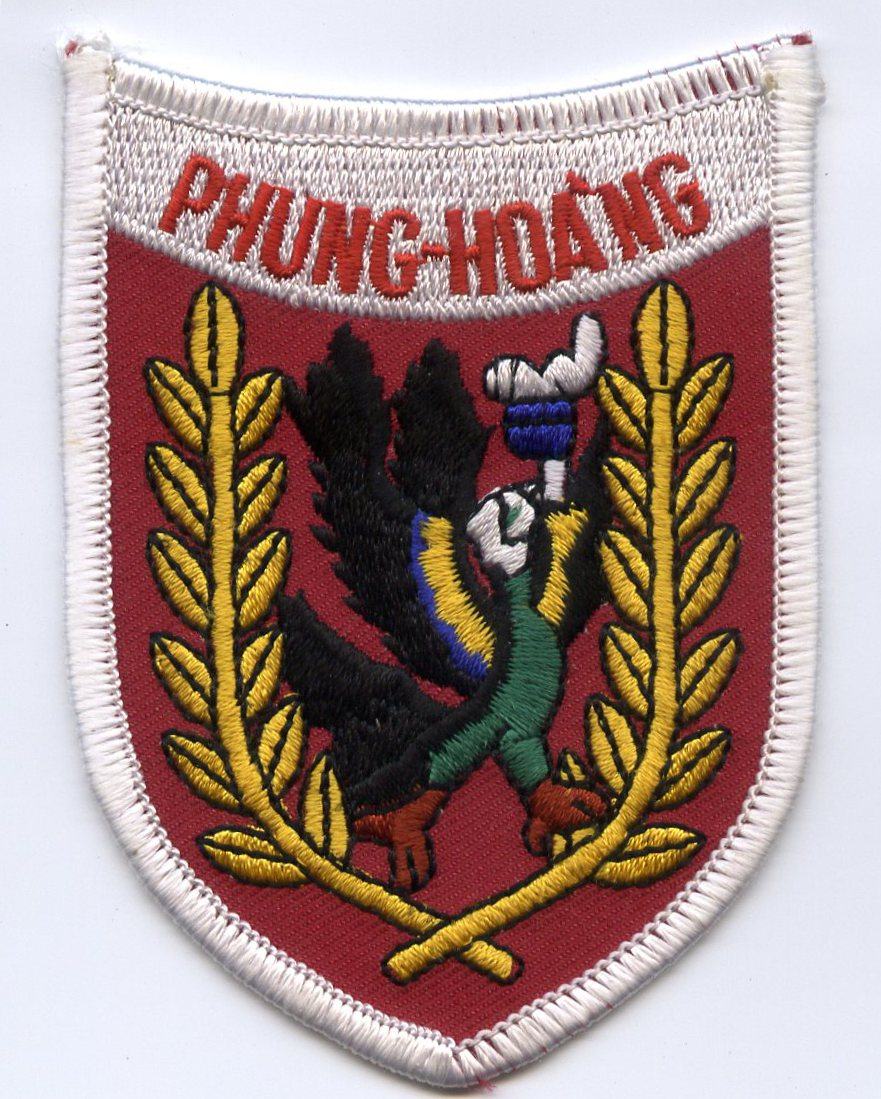
Badge of members of the Phoenix Program

=== Intelligence analysis ===
Early in January 1964 a coup led by Nguyen Khanh resulted in a "brain drain" of the already limited talent pool the South Vietnamese government had. Nguyen Khanh arrested many members of the Bureaucracy. Once released, these bureaucrats quit. The station had even more difficulty working with Successive South Vietnamese governments after that because their funding was more mishandled.

A Special National Intelligence Estimate (SNIE) issued in May theorized that a short but intense air and naval campaign against the DRV would deter an invasion of the South, although not stop activities there. It also estimated that this would be a strong morale boost to the RVN. The campaign described, however, was different than the actual gradual attacks that resulted from the Gulf of Tonkin incident in August. This tactic failed spectacularly, as it drove the North Vietnamese and Vietcong to use vicious guerrilla tactics against the U.S.

In October, another, less optimistic SNIE was issued, limited to the South. It said the situation was deteriorating, and a coup could occur at any time. The Prime Minister of the country, General Nguyen Khanh, stayed in power by placating various groups, while exhibiting little leadership of the country or the military. Defeatism was spreading from Saigon to the countryside, and was aggravated by a Montagnard revolt on September 20. No clear leadership was emerging. Much of this turmoil can be traced back to the Diem government and its inability to capture the hearts of the people like Ho Chi Minh had. The South Vietnamese government was completely detached from its people as much of its government was focused in Saigon (though most of the people lived in small villages and Hamlets in the countryside).

The Vietcong, however, were not seen to be planning an immediate takeover, but were concentrating on psychological operations to increase unrest in the south and among American forces.

Part of this unrest was detailed in a recently published for the public, book regarding the troubles of the Vietnam War and the CIA response and actions, CIA and the Generals. In 1964, the CIA was able to recognize the forward movement of the Viet Cong, which pushed the agency to use some tactics and machines to the countryside.

== Vietnam 1965 ==
=== Intelligence analysis ===
Special National Intelligence Estimate 10–9–65, was done to assess the reactions, in various parts of the world, to an escalation of U.S. attacks on North Vietnam. This estimate is especially significant in the conflict between the White House and the military and intelligence community. By summer of 1965 there were more than 125,000 U.S. ground troops in Vietnam and there did not seem to be an end in sight for their continuous arrival.

In August 1965, after Prime Minister Quat left the position and was replaced, the CIA worried that Buddhist protests would resume, as they had under Diem during the 1963 Buddhist crisis. In a special report on The Buddhists in South Vietnam from 1963, the CIA noted that they were tracking the discontent within the Buddhist community and trying to discern if these grievances could lead to political change within the country. In a section concerning political influences they write, "There seems to be little doubt that the intensity of the Buddhist protests reflected general discontent over the entrenched, autocratic rule of the Diems as well as specific grievances against their religious biases. there have been persistent reports that some extremist Buddhist leaders have been determined to keep up the momentum of demonstrations, not just to secure satisfaction of demands, but in hopes of bringing about the government's overthrow. Available information, however, indicates that most Buddhist leaders hoped to keep the religious issues isolated from broader political discontent and avoided collaboration with political opponents of Diem seeking to use the Buddhist issue to bring down his government". Diem's fight with the Buddhists lowered morale both within his government and his public support. The CIA feared that the Communists would exploit this in order to expand their influence in the community and made efforts to reduce Buddhist political involvement. An Quang Buddhists, led by Tri Quang, were contacted by the CIA. They offered to fund An Quang training programs in return for them remaining nonpolitical. The CIA felt that An Quang Buddhists may resume protests against the government because the new leader, Thieu was Catholic. The CIA wanted to keep the Buddhists out of conflict with the South Vietnamese during such a delicate time. Through December 1965, the CIA had given the An Quang Buddhists $12,500. This endeavor was successful in keeping the Buddhists out of the political arena.

In 1965, the CIA began gathering intelligence on Sihanoukville, a port in Cambodia that the CIA believed had importance to the Viet Cong. A CIA intelligence monograph on Sihanoukville written by Thomas L. Ahern Jr. entitled Good Questions, Wrong Answers CIA Estimates of Arms Traffic Through Sihanoukville, Cambodia, During the Vietnam War was declassified, but large portions of the monograph are redacted. The CIA reported on how the Viet Cong used Sihanoukville to supply its members in South Vietnam and in Cambodia. The agency examined traffic coming in and out of the port. It found that Chinese ships had visited Sihanoukville, but many United States officials and the Military Assistance Command Vietnam debated on the importance of the Chinese ships to the Viet Cong, leading to many visits to Sihanoukville. Certain individuals, whose names were redacted in the report, worked to prove the accounts, while others, also redacted, fought to disprove the reports.

== Vietnam 1966 ==
In early 1966, the Johnson Administration authorized an extensive development of the pacification effort and the Agency programs became the basis of the U.S. pacification strategy.

Late in 1966 the secret Polish-Italian peace attempt code-named Marigold by U.S. officials happened at a time when around 6,250 Americans had died. This peace talk happened 18 months before the Paris peace talks and more than 6 years before the accords that ended U.S. direct involvement in the fighting. This meeting was to take place in Warsaw, Poland between U.S. and North Vietnamese ambassadors to talk over a 10-point formula for a settlement. Marigold is to be one of the most controversial and intriguing diplomatic initiatives that remain shrouded in mystery.

The CIA also resumed trying to influence politics in Vietnam in 1966, by once again sending money to Saigon.

There was discussion about using nuclear weapons in Vietnam, with the CIA going so far as to draft a memo outlining their conclusions, the estimated reactions of the non-communist nations of the world, the communist nations of the world, long-term implications and the scenario in which they would be used. The memo stopped short of advocating against the usage of such weapons, saying "reactions would be affected...by the circumstances in which the US resorted to their use, and the targets attacked. But almost independent of these factors would be the widespread and fundamental revulsion that the US had broken the 20-year taboo on the use of nuclear weapons."

== Vietnam 1967 ==
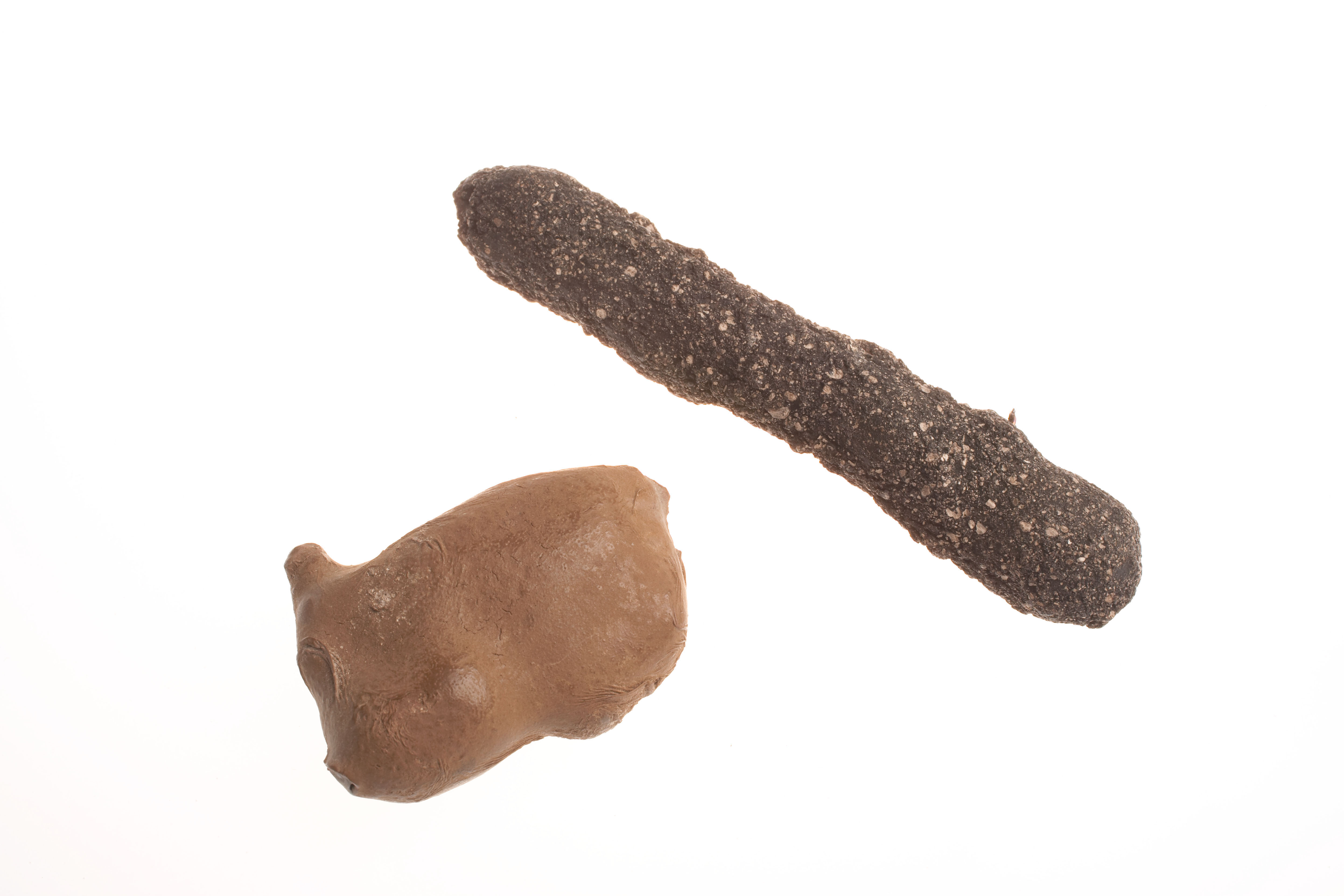
Created inside the CIA Science and Technology Directorate's labs, this seismic intruder detection device was disguised as tiger droppings

=== Covert action ===
The Phoenix Program was an attempt to attack the Vietcong infrastructure (VCI) with a "rifle shot rather than a shotgun approach to target key political leaders, command/control elements and activists in the VCI." It was also seen as a U.S. pacification effort. In that the VCI, as opposed to the main force VC/NVA combat forces, used terror against villagers, Phoenix can be considered a counterterror program using some of the same methods as its opponents. The main targets of this program were taking out the hierarchy of officials, guerrilla leaders, and local organization. The idea behind it was if the villages fell, as well as social order, the North Vietnamese would have to give in to American wills.

The creation of the Phoenix Program came as a result of a decade-long negligence on the part of the United States to track the activities of the Communist Party's political and administrative structure. From 1954 to 1964, the only intelligence offered by CIA efforts came in the form of a Hamlet Informant Program, which paid for information from untrained informants. Due to a lack in quality information, the CIA Station joined MACV J-2 and USOM's Public Safety Division in emphasizing a restructuring of intelligence. The Station wanted more centralization of intelligence, but US generals initially refused to offer a joint partnership in the efforts. As a result of this chasm in CIA and military intelligence efforts, the FBI broadened the National Interrogation Center for use by all security and intelligence operations. This change in strategy led to early successes, including the arrest of ninety-seven suspects identified under insurgent auspices, thanks in large part to information shared by police forces. If the interrogation did not yield desired intelligence, or if the suspect resisted, the suspect would be killed.

"Staffing of the advisory Phoenix program, meanwhile, was completed, at least in Saigon. The CIA contribution began with Chief of Station and Deputy Chief of Station membership on Komer's Phoenix Committee. It included, as already noted, Evan Parker as program director, and its Executive Officer, Chief of Operations, an analyst, and two secretaries also came from the Station. For the most part, the Stations participation in Phoenix staffing entailed a second hat for an Agency officer already working against the VCI. As Phoenix Chief of Operations, for example, John Hart was assigned to Civil Operations and Revolutionary Development Support (CORDS) the chief of his Intelligence. Operations Division (lOD), which conducted joint operations with the Police Special Branch. The entire division adopted CORDS cover under the title.

While Phoenix has often been called a CIA program, that is not entirely correct. It was under the direction of William Colby, who had been Saigon Deputy CIA Station Chief, and then Station Chief, between 1959 and 1962. He returned to Vietnam in 1968, as deputy to Robert Komer, the civilian head of the American efforts against the Communists, called CORDS. Shortly after arriving, Colby succeeded Komer as head of CORDS, which drew on a wide range of U.S. and South Vietnamese organizations, including the CIA station's Rural Development cadre.

There were many allegations of torture among The Phoenix Program. Such tactics included were: rape, gang rape, rape using eels, snakes, or hard objects, and rape followed by murder; electric shock ('the Bell Telephone Hour') rendered by attaching wires to the genitals or other sensitive parts of the body, like the tongue; the 'water treatment'; the 'airplane' in which the prisoner's arms were tied behind the back, and the rope looped over a hook on the ceiling, suspending the prisoner in midair, after which he or she was beaten; beatings with rubber hoses and whips; the use of police dogs to maul prisoners.

The Phoenix Program can be called a resounding failure. The South Vietnamese had a resounding lack of interest and investment in this part of the conflict. Many of those people who were captured and put into prison or who were executed were indeed not high ranking communists but were instead average citizens. Numerous neighbors would turn in individuals who were their personal enemies or people who owed them money. American troops would commonly buy into these stories. Many of the victims of The Phoenix Program were indeed innocent. By 1972, Phoenix operations were responsible for 81,740 Vietcong and 26,369 prisoners 'neutralized'.

=== Military action ===
The U.S. countered Viet Cong tactics through the use of prison camps, assassinations, and psychological warfare. The CIA planted sabotaged explosive Budweiser cans and poisoned cigarettes along the Ho Chi Minh trail, and the CIA extracted letters from communist bodies and used them as methods to gain intelligence.

== Vietnam 1968 ==
=== Operation Shock ===
Shortly after the Tet Offensive on February 2, a small group of CIA analysts who called themselves "brethren," led by George Carver, reacted to the attack by devising a plan they called, Operation Shock. The analysts were worried that the generals in the Vietnamese Government grew too comfortable with the American army helping them which led to growing support for the Vietcong. Their plan was to have the Vice President Ky "supervise a purge of all military and civilian officials guilty of corruption or other abuses." President Thieu would never have allowed the Vice President, who was his rival at the time, to lead a purging campaign, and as if knowing their plan would fail, the "brethren" included alternative solutions to turn the tide of the war including, forcing Thieu to resign and let a war hero come into office, temporarily stop bombardment of North Vietnam and initiate talks to try and negotiate surrender, or initiate talks with the National Liberation Front to possibly form a coalition government. The Director of Central Intelligence, Helms, silently handed off the plan to policymakers in Washington, who then relayed the information to President Johnson. Johnson's response was to talk with the Vietcong, stop bombardments, and announced that he was withdrawing from re-election. Vice President Hubert Humphrey is said to have later thanked Carver for stating that he "had a profound effect on the course of U.S. policy on Vietnam."

An important part of the CIA's mission in Vietnam was to constantly monitor what was happening in North Vietnam in order to help the war effort. Since the conflict was part of the Cold War, concerns about aid from the communist powers of China and the USSR constantly remained a concern. One 1968 memorandum demonstrates what was discussed. In the document, titled "Communist Aid to North Vietnam," the types of aid being provided by the Chinese and the Russians are described in detail, with sections on economic and military aid. On October 31, 1968, President Johnson announced a suspension of bombing attacks on the North Vietnam.

== Vietnam 1969 ==
In November 1968 President Johnson had written something pertaining to the bombing of North Vietnam. Kissinger tried to convince the CIA to form a smart plan in order to take action on the military targets on North Vietnam. They responded to him by using Laotian guerrillas to go through different barracks and storage facilities located at Dien Bien Phu. Though most organizations figured that the costs would outweigh the benefits, Kissinger still convinced them to go through with it. In December 1969 Kissinger tried to get more strikes on "lucrative targets" in North Vietnam. On March 10 a pipeline located in North Vietnam by the Mu Gia Pass was wrecked. When the government in Cambodia changed the US became more concerned. On April 3 a second pipeline operation had failed but Headquarters encouraged them to keep trying

On April 25 they had tried again but soon had to stop when they came across a North Vietnamese bivouac. On July 3, 1969, the CIA produced an assessment of their collection program pertaining to the North Vietnamese logistics network (Ho Chi Minh trail). The document was intended to be read by Henry Kissinger and detailed the current inventory of CIA collection activities and their corresponding recommendations. Based on the document, the CIA was having difficulty identifying the total logistics structure of North Vietnam (between Laos and Cambodia) and the quantities/frequency of the supplies being transported. It was noted that the supply route in Laos was more active than Cambodia. (Due to the terrain of Cambodia). Though the CIA collection program was predominantly supported by technical and human collection, the high level of hostility made human collection very difficult. The recommendation of the assessment listed the need for more road watchers (to supplement human collection) and more sensors, aerial reconnaissance and wire taps for technical collection.

The constant pressure placed on Thieu from the Station began to take its toll by the end of the 1960s. On May 25, 1969, President Thieu created another political organization called the National Social Democratic Front (NSDF) in attempts to rival the Communists. Since the NSDF had a larger network than the Lien Minh, it quickly gained financial support from the U.S. However, despite all the resources that were being devoted to the organization, the NSDF failed to satisfy expectations and was largely considered to be a disappointment. Many politicians refused to work with a vexed associate of the organization named Houng. The National Salvation Front rejected the NSDF's consolidation request for this very reason. Moreover, the NSDF did not have any success with integrating its constituent parts. The CIA's experiment with the NSDF fizzled out and lasted about a year. Thieu did not want to turn pacification into a political task and would offer no supplemental ideology or program to replace Communism in Vietnam.

=== Mixed covert action and intelligence collection ===
Katrosh wanted Theiu and Ky to get along, so that "there would finally be political cohesion in South Vietnam" and ended up using the CIA as the main proponent to help make this happen. Eventually, Katrosh was successful in bringing the two together for the Lien Minh inauguration. Theiu did not want to be personally involved with the Lien Minh organizational activity. Bunker wanted Katrosh's help with pursuing him, so he was sending large sums of CIA money, in the amount of $400,000 to Katrosh.

Neither the CIA nor the military really wanted Phoenix. A footnote to a report on the program may be more to the point than the main report

On December 15 Secretary of Defense Melvin Laird met with George A. Carver, Jr., the DCI's Special Assistant for Vietnamese Affairs. In a December 15 memorandum to Helms, Carver stated that Laird was anxious to remove all U.S. military personnel from the PRU program, as were MACV commanding general Creighton Abrams and the Joint Chiefs of Staff. Laird admitted that his concerns were "political," and he wanted to avoid a flap over the PRU in which U.S. military personnel would be associated. Carver explained that recent steps had been taken to tighten controls over the program, curtail the operational involvement of U.S. military personnel, and shift the emphasis to intelligence collection from ambush or "elimination." Carver argued that the sudden removal of U.S. military personnel, who were already in the process of being gradually reduced, would be a mistake and would jeopardize the program. Laird agreed to reconsider his view.

The main report gives the level of U.S. involvement, showing the Phoenix personnel were primarily South Vietnamese.

The Provincial Reconnaissance Unit (PRU) Program in South Vietnam forms an investigative and paramilitary attack upon the covert communist apparatus in South Vietnam. PRU teams, currently totaling approximately 4,200 men, operate in 44 provinces of South Vietnam. PRU are based in their home areas and operate in teams of 15–20 men. They are presently advised and supported by 101 U.S. military advisors and seven CIA personnel. CIA funds the PRU and retains overall administrative control of the project for the U.S. Government.

Reasons against continued CIA involvement included a concern, much like that raised during the Korean War, about diverting CIA from its national level to a tactical role:

1. Continued U.S. support of the PRU program risks adverse publicity either through an untoward incident, a press campaign to publicize its efforts or complaints from accommodation-minded South Vietnamese officials or politicians.
2. CIA will have to continue its support to a program which lies, at least in part, outside its usual intelligence mission.

Vietnam 1969–1972 CIA's pacification programs in Vietnam deteriorated because the Vietnamese chose to not invest in them. Although this is contradicted in the CIA's history books which state that The National Liberation Front was beaten by the pacification programs

=== Psychological operations ===
From a psychological operations perspective, The Vietnam War Phoenix Program is controversial to this day. Supporters say that it was a legal and closely controlled U.S.–Vietnamese intelligence program aimed at destroying the Vietcong infrastructure, while the critics say that it was an illegal system of arresting, torturing and murdering innocent Vietnamese civilians...

"Military Assistance Command Vietnam (MACV) Directive 381-41, dated 9 July 1967, inaugurated the Intelligence Coordination and Exploitation (ICEX) program to Attack the Vietcong Infrastructure (VCI). In late 1967, MACV replaced the name "ICEX" with "Phoenix," after a mythical bird that appeared as a sign of prosperity and luck and a near translation of the South Vietnamese name for the program, "Phung Hoang" ("All-seeing bird")."

As early as 1964, General William C. Westmoreland, commander of Military Assistance Command Vietnam (MACV) "knew that he lacked the forces to wage both a war of attrition and one of pacification, so he chose the former. The argument over whether or not this was the right course of action will likely go on forever, but undoubtedly the shape of the war changed dramatically after the Tet Offensive. The enemy was badly mauled and, despite the political gains made, militarily lost the initiative for quite some time."

When the VC regrouped after the Tet Offensive, "Westmoreland never had such an advantage. When American ground forces entered the war in 1965, they faced an enemy on the offensive, but in June 1968 the new MACV commander, General Creighton W. Abrams, confronted an enemy on the ropes. Abrams plainly recognized his advantage and implemented a clear-and-hold strategy aimed at moving into rural enclaves formerly dominated by the VC."

Much criticized for lack of precision, the Phoenix Program was described by a former official as a "sterile depersonalized murder program...I never knew an individual to be detained as a VC suspect who ever lived through an interrogation" Also many of the people captured under the Phoenix program can be seen as innocent. Many of the thousands of victims were given to the Americans cause of petty disputes among neighbors and for personal gain. Phoenix also had little chance for success because the Vietcong had the operation filled with their double agents from the beginning.

Numerous left-wing websites have William Colby assigning an Operation Phoenix body count of 20,587 Vietcong enemy combatants and have the South Vietnamese Government reporting the death toll as 40,994. Representative of these is page 5 of a book by author Ami Chen Mills

The psy-war tactics that were most usefully used by the Vietcong were the use of booby traps. They came in all shapes and sizes and in varying degrees of sophistication, but they had a huge impact on the morale of American troops. These traps were not meant to kill, but instead maim and injure because it instilled more fear in the enemy soldiers, and because it took 4–5 men to care for 1 injured soldier, when a dead soldier would be less of a strain on resources. The Vietcong also used tunnels to their advantage. They could sneak out of their hiding spaces and take out a few American soldiers at a time. This increased the fear of the enemy because attacks could happen at any time and anywhere

=== Operation Wandering Soul ===
Another psychological warfare tactic utilized by the CIA was Operation Wandering Soul. This preyed on the superstitions of the Vietnamese. It was believed that if one died away from one's family and was not buried with their ancestors, then they would be forced to wander forever, their souls in pain. The U.S. recorded tapes of South Vietnamese actors wailing, searching for their loved ones and imploring the Viet Cong to "desert the army to save your soul." These tapes were broadcast by GIs walking about with speakers or by overhead choppers.

Another broadcast used at Nui Ba Den Mountain in 1970 used an actual recording of a tiger from a zoo in Bangkok. A rumor was spread of a tiger attacking the Viet Cong to supplement the playing of the recording. Allegedly, this acted as a catalyst for 150 Viet Cong leaving their positions. Leaflets were also used to amplify this scare tactic.

== Vietnam 1970 and after ==
The CIA ran extensive espionage and covert action programs during the Vietnam War. This included gathering intelligence on America’s ally, the Republic of South Vietnam. In addition, one of CIA’s key operational areas was advising the government of South Vietnam on various domestic policies and military strategies. For example, following the U.S. “Vietnamization” policy of force drawdowns, CIA’s Saigon station worked closely with U.S. Ambassador Ellsworth Bunker in advising President Nguyễn Văn Thiệu on running new rural pacification programs. With presidential elections approaching in 1971, the U.S. was concerned that South Vietnam demonstrate it was a thriving participatory democracy. The CIA Saigon station “proposed major new programs of political mobilization, land reform, and economic improvements” but the South Vietnam government lacked the interest and resources to implement any of the measures. Embassy and CIA officials attempted to recruit opposition candidates to run against Thiệu—not to unseat Thiệu, but to give the appearance of a functioning democracy in South Vietnam. Ultimately, however, Thiệu ran unopposed and was installed for another four-year term.

CIA’s Thomas Polgar replaced Ted Shackley as chief of Saigon station in January 1972. Following the Easter offensive in March 1972, Polgar advised CIA headquarters that U.S. withdrawal was not feasible, as American support was “essential for survival of non-Communist Vietnam” given USSR and PRC support of North Vietnam. As the U.S. pushed for a diplomatic settlement of the war in the Paris negotiations with North Vietnam, the U.S. diplomats and CIA officials (viz. Polgar) negotiated with Thiệu and other government officials regarding the terms of cease-fire and other matters of negotiation. Thiệu’s relationship with Nixon White House was strained, particularly Thiệu’s trust in Henry Kissinger to negotiate in South Vietnam’s best interests. However, U.S. funding and continued air support served as the ultimate points of leverage to force the government of South Vietnam to go along with the Nixon/Kissinger diplomatic strategy. During the Paris negotiations CIA’s Polgar and U.S. Ambassador Bunker served as essential intermediaries to broker a consensus between Thiệu and the White House. Following the “Christmas bombing” campaign (Operation Linebacker II), the U.S. and Hanoi signed a cease-fire agreement on January 20, 1973, paving the way for a total U.S. military withdrawal.

From the spring of 1973 to late winter 1974, the cease fire with North Vietnam largely held while the Viet Cong insurgency continued in South Vietnam. In Polger’s estimation, the cease-fire agreement allowed for South Vietnam to consolidate its control over areas in the south with high population densities. However, Polger also recognized South Vietnam was unable to pacify rural areas with heavy Viet Cong activities. Furthermore, corruption in both ARVN and the South Vietnam government remained key challenges to popular support. In June 1973 Ambassador Graham Martin replaced Ellsworth Bunker. Martin was unable to establish a strong working relationship with Thiệu, making Saigon station’s government liaison work even more critical to the U.S. Polger and other officials at CIA’s Saigon station focused on liaison activities with Thiệu’s government. The main focus was on striking a peace deal and formation of a coalition government with North Vietnam. The CIA established a diplomatic back channel through the Hungarian embassy, leading Polger and Bunker to believe North Vietnam preferred a diplomatic settlement. Given Thiệu’s resistance to negotiating with North Vietnam, U.S. diplomats and CIA officials made efforts to find a new president for South Vietnam. All of this political maneuvering was taking place as the northern front fell to North Vietnam’s ultimate offensive in March 1975. The CIA was successful in arranging for Thiệu to go into exile in Taiwan; however, General Dương Văn Minh took over as president on April 27, 1975, days before the fall of Saigon.

With its "Vietnamization" doctrine, proclaimed in early 1969, the Nixon administration began the gradual withdrawal of the United States from ground combat in South Vietnam. The end goal of this was to strengthen the military of South Vietnam. An expanded program of irregular operations in the eastern Panhandle was more productive. There was a lot of pressure for Nixon to withdraw from Indochina on the home front. Johnson's bombing of North Vietnam in 1968 really got backlash from the citizens back in America. There were a lot of protests all over the United States because of this. Even though the war was ending in Vietnam, protestors in the United States were still going crazy as the troops were returning from the battlefield. During the Nixon Presidency, domestic pressure to withdrawal from Indochina exponentially increased. However, Nixon was determined to escape the embarrassment of an American military defeat in Vietnam. Needing to rectify the aggravated electorate and ensure the prospects of shaping the settlement in Vietnam from a position of strength, Nixon and Kissinger turned to the CIA. Kissinger ordered the CIA to carry out "high political and psychological impact actions against military targets in North Vietnam." The Agency sponsored Laotian guerrillas to erode the enemy's confidence in the security of the trail network. On 22 February 1970, the Commando Raider operations began and set ablaze administrative and storage buildings in Dien Bien Phu, and sabotaged a pipeline near Mu Gia Pass. The success of these operations enticed the CIA station in Vientiane to adopt them as a staple of its agenda. The change of government's Cambodia in March 1970 signaled an opportunity to expand the Commando Raider operations. The CIA gathered more intelligence pertaining to the specifics of troop movements and the location of NVA supplies. Raids to destroy these supplies became common. The CIA focused on the complete interdiction of the trail system that extended through Laos and Cambodia. While many of these raids were successful, it was a futile operation. The "means [were] inadequate to the end." The CIA spent a great amount of resources and energy into preparing these raids, collecting intelligence, and carrying out attempts to further undermine the enemy now defeating them. In May 1970, a raid ended in disaster when all but four of 21 members were captured or killed. The use of CIA covert action, particularly by Kissinger, illustrates the tendency of the White House to circumvent domestic or foreign restraints. The President dealt under the table to accomplish its strategic interests while hoping to save face among the electorate. Furthermore, the ultimate failure of CIA covert action reflected a recurring trend in the Agency's history—no matter the amount of intelligence collected, resources amassed, or strategies implemented, the Agency still failed to understand its enemy. Although the CIA had some success in anticipating the North Vietnamese offensive of 1972, the agency's last station chief in South Vietnam argued that "the illusion that the war is over and we have won is shattered."

Even as late as 1971, the United States worried about resistance in the region along with the want of at least one American ambassador in order to allow for a Thieu victory in the region. Not only this, but there were attempts by the U.S. in order to garner Catholic support for Thieu in the country in order to set up footing among Chinese nationals and other groups. However, the senatorial election of 1970 caused American interest in the political machinations of South Vietnam at least to subside, even if they were interested as late as 1971.

A series of accusations in the early 1970s that the CIA was complicit in drug trafficking in Laos was a contributing factor in the public's opposition to U.S. activities in Southeast Asia. Neither the CIA nor any of its officers were accused of direct activity in the narcotics operations. It is likely that the agency did not focus much energy on the trafficking by indigenous allies until a heroin epidemic broke out among U.S. troops in South Vietnam. There was nothing preventing the hill tribes in northern Laos from producing and selling opium until 1971, as the trade was an economic benefactor to the tribes, but under U.S. pressure, the Laotian government made it illegal. These activities predate the war on drugs in the United States and there was not even a reporting requirement in place until after Nixon's war on drugs had been declared.

In 1972, The U.S. signed an agreement put forth by the Democratic Republic of Vietnam (during Nixon's administration) that stated that the U.S. must cease fire immediately throughout Vietnam and that there should be no more U.S. military involvement in Vietnam. Also, there should also be a return of all captured personnel of the parties, and most importantly the U.S. must agree on South Vietnam's right to self determine their own government.

The ARVN had fallen apart by 1975 partially due to the North Vietnamese offensive, but it was not the sole reason. Since the North Vietnamese had been attacking everything, including B-52s and naval vessels, they had grown stronger and the South appeared to get weaker. The headquarters had tried to get information pertaining to Thieu's "grand design" on March 20. Headquarters decided to work on the responsibilities with the Communists and to gain support for the refugees that were moving away from the Communists.

== CIA interactions with KGB in Vietnam ==
In 1965, the KGB cooperated with the North Vietnamese Army by providing radio equipment and training NVA personnel in radio counter-espionage. The KGB also took matters into direct control with the capture of CIA agents and interrogation along with recruitment of said agents. The KGB also send ELINT (electronic intelligence) equipment to the Vietnamese in 1968 which further complicated the CIA objectives to gain intelligence on the NVA.

== See also ==
- United States–Vietnam relations
- CIA transnational anti-crime and anti-drug activities
- Central Intelligence Office – South Vietnamese intelligence
- PTF boat
- Yung Krall – a postwar spy
