= Manouchehr Hashemi =

Iranian general and intelligence officer

Timsar Manouchehr Hashemi
- منوچهر هاشمی

Director of the Eighth General Directorate of SAVAK
- In office 1963 – September 1978
- Monarch: Mohammad Reza Pahlavi

Personal details
- Born: 16 July 1918 Khoy, West Azerbaijan province, Qajar Iran
- Died: 7 October 2007 (aged 89)

Military service
- Allegiance: Pahlavi Iran
- Branch/service: Imperial Iranian Ground Force
- Years of service: 1938–1979
- Rank: Lieutenant general

General Manouchehr Hashemi (Persian: منوچهر هاشمی; 16 July 1918, Khoy — 7 October 2007) was an Iranian intelligence officer for the Shah's SAVAK. He was the head of the provincial offices of SAVAK in Fars and Khorasan provinces, and later head of its counterintelligence department commonly known as department VIII. After his career as an Army Infantry officer, he became one of SAVAK's longest-serving senior officers (serving from 1957 to 1979), he had previously been head of the provincial offices of SAVAK in the provinces of Fars and Khorasan. Excerpts from Hashemi's history of SAVAK were published in Payam-e Emrooz in 1988.

Hashemi played a minor role in the Iran–Contra affair, introducing Theodore Shackley to Manucher Ghorbanifar and Hassan Karroubi (brother of Mehdi Karroubi).
