= Brought to Light =

1988 comics anthology

- The cover of the Brought to Light paperback
- Date: 13 December 1988
- Page count: 76 pages
- Publisher: Eclipse Comics; Warner Books

Creative team
- Writers: Alan Moore; Joyce Brabner
- Artists: Bill Sienkiewicz; Tom Yeates; Paul Mavrides
- Editors: Joyce Brabner; Catherine Yronwode
- ISBN: 091303567X

Brought to Light – subtitled Thirty Years of Drug Smuggling, Arms Deals, and Covert Action – is an anthology of two political graphic novels, published originally by Eclipse Comics in 1988.

== Creation ==
Both stories were based upon research by the Christic Institute, who initiated the work. Joyce Brabner, then married to Harvey Pekar, had already helped co-ordinate Real War Stories with Eclipse Comics and the Central Committee for Conscientious Objectors, and planned Brought to Light as a thematic follow-up. Eclipse publisher Dean Mullaney and editor-in-chief Cat Yronwode first attempted to get Chuck Dixon, writer of politically charged stories for Airboy, involved but he considered the Institute "far-left" and considered that a lot of their theories strayed into "aluminium foil hat territory".

Alan Moore, Bill Sienkiewicz and Tom Yeates contributed to the book, which was co-published with Warner Books and was distributed to mainstream bookstores. In an interview with the British magazine Escape, Moore noted "I'm humanizing these vast subjects by having the story narrated by a shadowy figure in a bar... the CIA eagle. The reader sits next to this hideous representation of America’s covert warfare activities that spills its whole life story, as drunks are prone to do in bars." Sienkiewicz explained his involvement by telling Amazing Heroes "I think people are really turning a blind eye to [the CIA's involvement in foreign government affairs], the cocaine and everything else, and I think it's important that they be made a little more aware of what's going on. This book will do that, inform them, and hopefully do it entertainingly. I feel that if it's not the most important series or book I've done, it's damn near up there." The novel brought coverage in Mother Jones, Interview and Vanity Fair, something Brabner felt was important to help spread word about the events. The book was initially set to be published on 11 November 1988 before delays pushed it back to 13 December.

Eclipse arranged for Tom Yeates to sign copies of the book in Cody's Books in Berkeley, California on the first day of the Oliver North trial. There were rumors that Moore was unable to travel to America due to the CIA being annoyed at his contribution to Brought to Light; however, the real reason was Moore not renewing his passport.

== Contents ==
=== Shadowplay: The Secret Team ===
Written by Alan Moore; illustrated by Bill Sienkiewicz; introduction by Daniel Sheehan.

The narrative covers the history of the Central Intelligence Agency and its involvement in the Vietnam War, the Iran-Contra affair, and its relationship with figures like Augusto Pinochet and Manuel Noriega. The narrator of is an aging anthropomorphic American Eagle, presented as a bellicose, retired CIA agent who approaches an unseen character in a bar. The eagle proceeds to drink alcohol and, in a drunken stupor, divulge all the details of The Agency's past. Early on a reference is made to the number of gallons an Olympic-size swimming pool can hold, and the fact that an adult human body has one gallon of blood; from then on, the victims of CIA activities - directly or indirectly - are quantified in swimming pools filled with blood, with each pool representing 20,000 dead.

=== 30 Years of Covert War ===
A two-page feature by Paul Mavrides, the "World Map of 30 Years of Covert Action" details what the Christic Institute purported to be election tampering, drug trafficking, assassination, and other crimes committed by the CIA.

=== Flashpoint: The LA Penca Bombing ===
Written by Joyce Brabner, based on an account by Martha Honey and Tony Avirgan; illustrated by Tom Yeates; coloured by Sam Parsons; lettered by Bill Pearson.

An account of the La Penca bombing during the civil war in Nicaragua in 1984. Honey and Avirgan were both present, and their investigation would lead to the Oliver North trial.

== Reception ==
Reviewing the graphic novel for Amazing Heroes, Ed Sample found himself unmoved by much of the narrative due to its clumsy and heavy-handed storytelling, but reflected it was an important catalyst to thought and discussion. More positive views came from more traditional literary journals, including Publishers Weekly and American Library Association's Booklist. Brought to Light was nominated for the 1989 Harvey Awards in the 'Best Graphic Album' category but lost out to another Moore project, Batman: The Killing Joke.

== Audio version ==
Shadowplay was made into a spoken word performance by Codex Books in 1998; Moore provided the narration himself, which was set to music by the composer Gary Lloyd.
