= Daniel Sheehan (attorney) =

American lawyer (born 1945)

Daniel Peter Sheehan
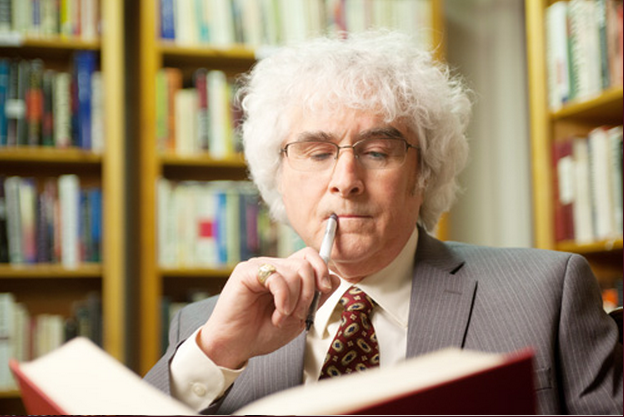
- Sheehan in 2012
- Born: April 9, 1945 (age 81); Glens Falls
- Education: Harvard University (BA, JD)
- Occupation: Chief counsel of the Romero Institute
- Website: www.danielpsheehan.com

Daniel Peter Sheehan (born April 9, 1945) is a constitutional and public interest lawyer, public speaker, political activist and educator.

External audio
- The Midnight Soldiers. Sheehan delivers a speech on the Iran-Contra scandal at the World Affairs Conference at University of Colorado Boulder (April 1987). 116 mins.

== Biography ==
=== Early life ===
Sheehan was born in Glens Falls, New York, and grew up in Warrensburg, New York. He attended Northeastern University before transferring to Harvard College, graduating in 1967 with a degree in American Government Studies. He then attended Harvard Law School, graduating in 1970 with a Juris Doctor degree.

He was briefly a member of the Army's ROTC program at Northeastern University, but resigned after questioning the sanity of the instructors. He claims he was told that he might have to kill non-combatants in Vietnam.

=== Career ===
Over his career, Sheehan has participated in numerous legal cases of public interest, including the Pentagon Papers case, the Watergate Break-In case, the Silkwood case, the Greensboro massacre case, the La Penca bombing case and others. He established the Christic Institute and the Romero Institute, two non-profit public policy centers. Since 2015 Sheehan has lectured on American history, politics and the assassination of John F. Kennedy at the University of California, Santa Cruz. Sheehan is currently Chief Counsel of the Romero Institute, where his focus is the Lakota People's Law Project. Sheehan and The Lakota People's Law Project participated in legal cases related to the Dakota Access Pipeline protests. In 2013 Sheehan published Daniel Sheehan: The People's Advocate, a memoir, through Counterpoint Publishing.

At one time, Sheehan was legal counsel to the Jesuit U.S. national headquarters in Washington, D.C.

== Avirgan v. Hull ==
In 1986, the Christic Institute filed a $24 million civil suit on behalf of journalists Tony Avirgan and Martha Honey, stating that various individuals were part of a conspiracy responsible for the La Penca bombing that injured Avirgan. The suit charged the defendants with illegally participating in assassinations, as well as arms and drug trafficking. Among the 30 defendants named were Iran-Contra figures John K. Singlaub, Richard Secord, Albert Hakim, and Robert W. Owen; CIA officials Thomas G. Clines and Theodore Shackley; Contra leader Adolfo Calero; Medellín Cartel leaders Pablo Escobar and Jorge Ochoa; Costa Rican rancher John Hull; and former mercenary Sam N. Hall.

On June 23, 1988, United States federal judge James Lawrence King of the United States District Court for the Southern District of Florida dismissed the case, stating: "The plaintiffs have made no showing of existence of genuine issues of material fact with respect to either the bombing at La Penca, the threats made to their news sources or threats made to themselves." According to The New York Times, the case was dismissed by King at least in part due to "the fact that the vast majority of the 79 witnesses Mr. Sheehan cites as authorities were either dead, unwilling to testify, fountains of contradictory information or at best one person removed from the facts they were describing." King ordered the Christic Institute to pay $955,000 in attorney's fees and $79,500 in court costs. The United States Court of Appeals for the Eleventh Circuit affirmed the ruling, and the Supreme Court of the United States let the judgment stand by refusing to hear an additional appeal. The IRS stripped the Institute of its 501(c)(3) nonprofit status after claiming the suit was politically motivated. The fine was levied in accordance with Rule 11 of the Federal Rules of Civil Procedure which can penalize lawyers for frivolous lawsuits.

In the wake of the dismissal, Christic attorneys and Honey and Avirgan traded accusations over who was to blame for the failure of the case. Avirgan complained that Sheehan had handled matters poorly by chasing unsubstantiated "wild allegations" and conspiracy theories, rather than paying attention to core factual issues.

== UFOs and alien visitation ==
Sheehan has spoken publicly about unidentified flying objects (UFOs) and alien visitation, and has served as counsel for Harvard University psychiatrist John E. Mack as well as Steven Greer's Disclosure Project. He represents Luis Elizondo, the former director of the Advanced Aerospace Threat Identification Program in a case against the United States Department of Defense.

== Works ==
=== Books ===
- People's Advocate: The Life and Legal History of America's Most Fearless Public Interest Lawyer. Berkeley, Calif.: Counterpoint (2013). ISBN 978-1619021723.

=== Book contributions ===
- Introduction to Shadowplay: The Secret Team, by Alan Moore and Bill Sienkiewicz. Based on the lawsuit filed by the Christic Institute. Forestville, Calif.: Eclipse Books (1989).
  - Published in Brought to Light: Thirty Years of Drug Smuggling, Arms Deals, and Covert Action, a double-feature graphic novel edited by Joyce Brabner. The second story is Flashpoint: The La Penca Bombing, documented by Tony Avirgan and Martha Honey and adapted by Joyce Brabner and Thomas Yeates, with an introduction by Jonathan V. Marshall.

=== Transcripts ===
- Assault on Nicaragua: The Untold Story of the "Secret War"—Speeches by Daniel Sheehan and Daniel Ortega. San Francisco: Walnut Pub. Co. (1987). OCLC 1147727164. Edited with introduction by Rod Holt.
  - "The Secret Team Behind the Iran-Contra Scandal." Piedmont, California (September 4, 1987). Remarks at a casual after-dinner gathering of friends and supporters of the Christic Institute. Sheehan spoke earlier that day at a gathering of leaders of organized labor in San Francisco. pp. 16-54.
  - "A Discussion with Daniel Sheehan and Sarah Nelson." Los Angeles, California (February 1, 1987). pp. 55-78.

=== Audio recordings ===
- Contragate: The Secret Team, with the Christic Institute. Santa Barbara, Calif.: Other Americas Radio (1987). OCLC 23443012.

== See also ==
- Peter Gersten
