= Romero Institute =

Law firm based in California

- Mission: The Institute uses a combination of public education, community organizing, and legal action to bring about structural change to address the issues that threaten our human family.
- President: Daniel Sheehan
- Head: Sara Nelson
- Location: Santa Cruz, California
- Website: RomeroInstitute.org

The Romero Institute is a nonprofit law and public policy center in Santa Cruz, California. The organization was formed by activists of the Christic Institute and is named after the late Archbishop of San Salvador, St. Óscar Arnulfo Romero. The institute has three main projects: the Lakota People's Law Project based in part in the Dakotas, as well as The New Paradigm Institute and Greenpower, both based in California.

== History ==
=== Beginnings in the Christic Institute ===
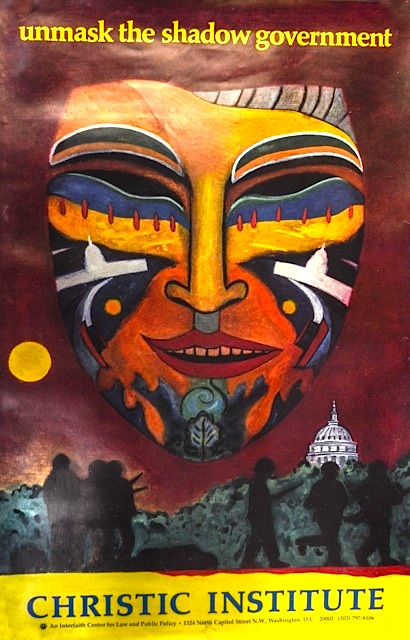
"Unmask the Shadow Government"- Poster from the Christic Institute.

The Christic Institute was a public interest law firm founded in 1980 by Daniel Sheehan, his wife Sara Nelson, and their partner, William J. Davis, a Jesuit priest. They had gained a win in the Silkwood case and wanted to continue public interest law.

Christic represented victims of the nuclear disaster at Three Mile Island. In 1985, they filed a civil suit for damages against KKK and American Nazi Party members who had killed civil rights demonstrators in the 1979 Greensboro Massacre. In litigation by the state in a criminal trial and the federal government under civil rights law, all defendants had been acquitted by all-white juries. In addition, the Institute had accused local police and Federal agents of knowing of the potential for violent confrontation and failing to protect the marchers. The Institute defended Catholic workers providing sanctuary to Salvadoran refugees (American Sanctuary Movement).

The institute was based in Washington, D.C., with offices in several other major U.S. cities. The Institute received funding from a nationwide network of grass-roots donors, as well as organizations like the New World Foundation.

In 1988, the Christic Institute was ordered to pay $955,000 in attorneys fees and $79,500 in court costs as the result of a $24 million lawsuit that was deemed to be frivolous by the United States District Court for the Southern District of Florida. The ruling was subsequently upheld by the United States Court of Appeals for the Eleventh Circuit and the Supreme Court of the United States. In addition, the Institute lost its non-profit status, as the IRS ruled that its suit had been politically motivated.

In the wake of this loss, Daniel Sheehan and Sara Nelson regrouped. In 1992, they became the leaders of the Christic Institute's successor organization, the Romero Institute.

== Other projects ==
=== New Paradigm Institute ===
The New Paradigm Institute (NPI) was founded in 2023 by Daniel Sheehan and Sara Nelson as a subsidiary of the Romero Institute. Jim Garrison joined later that same year as the director of the Washington, D.C. office. On the heels of Danny Sheehan’s 40 years of UFO advocacy, dating back to the Carter administration, NPI was founded as a public policy and law citizen watchdog group to follow the progress of the UAP Disclosure Act (later passed into law as Subtitle C - National Defense Authorization Act for Fiscal Year 2024 (NDAA). The mission of the New Paradigm Institute is to inform the public of the true facts surrounding the UFO/ET phenomenon and to mobilize citizens to secure full and responsible disclosure of information held by the federal government and its private contractors about UFO technology and nonhuman intelligent visitors.

=== Lakota People's Law Project ===
Founded in 2004, the Lakota People's Law Project (LPLP) began as a group of Lakota grandmothers organizing around issues relating to the Indian Child Welfare Act. The "Lakota Child Rescue Project" was created to assist in the return of Lakota children to families, tribes, and communities and expanded to include the creation of a tribal foster care program funded with direct Title IV-E of the Civil Rights Act of 1964 funds from the federal government.

In 2016, the Lakota People's Law Project expanded its mission to include land and water issues during the controversial protests against the Dakota Access Pipeline on the Standing Rock Sioux Tribe Indian Reservation in North Dakota. LPLP defended water protector and attorney Chase Iron Eyes following his arrest in February 2017 and attempted to use a Necessity Defense in his trial, claiming that Iron Eyes had no choice to resist the Dakota Access Pipeline due to risks posed to his family and drinking water. Prosecutors dropped felony charges against Iron Eyes in August 2018.

=== Greenpower ===
Greenpower, founded in the beginning of 2016, is a community-based organization aiming to aid the transition away from fossil fuels to locally produced and controlled renewable energy. Accomplishments include a robust organizing effort for Monterey Bay Community Power, a community choice energy program in San Benito, Santa Cruz, and Monterey counties. More recently, Greenpower has extended its work to advocate for community choice energy in other parts of the state.

=== U.C. Santa Cruz Course on Justice ===
Daniel Sheehan taught a college-level course at the University of California, Santa Cruz on social justice entitled "The Trajectory of Justice: Eight Cases that Changed America." The course examines foundational cases between 1970 and 2000: Eisenstadt v. Baird (1970), Pentagon Papers Case (1971), In re Pappas (1972), U.S. v. James W. McCord, Jr. (1973), Silkwood v. Kerr-McGee Corp. (1975), Greensboro Massacre (Waller v. Butkovich) (1985), American Sanctuary Movement Case (U.S. v. Stacey Lynn Merkt, et al.) (1984) and Avirgan v. Hull and the Iran-Contra Affair (1986).
