= Christic Institute =

American law firm

- Founders: Daniel Sheehan, Sara Nelson, Father Bill Davis
- Established: 1980
- Location: Washington, D.C.
- Website: Christic Institute Archives
- Dissolved: 1991
- In 1998, Christic was succeeded by the Romero Institute, with Daniel Sheehan and Sara Nelson continuing as leaders.

The Christic Institute was a public interest law firm founded in 1980 by Daniel Sheehan, his wife Sara Nelson, and their partner, William J. Davis, a Jesuit priest, after the successful conclusion of their work on the Silkwood case. Based on the ecumenical teachings of Pierre Teilhard de Chardin, and on the lessons they learned from their experience in the Silkwood fight, the Christic Institute combined investigation, litigation, education and organizing into a unique model for social reform in the United States. In 1992 the firm lost its non-profit status after having a federal case dismissed by the court in 1988 and being penalized for filing a "frivolous lawsuit". The IRS said that the Christic Institute had acted for political reasons. The case was related to journalists injured in relation to the Iran–Contra Affair. The group was succeeded by a new firm, the Romero Institute.

Christic notably represented victims of the nuclear disaster at Three Mile Island; they prosecuted KKK and American Nazi Party members for killing Communist Workers Party demonstrators in the 1979 Greensboro Massacre (they also charged certain police and federal agents who they said had known about potential violence and had not adequately protected the victims); and they defended Catholic workers providing sanctuary to Salvadoran refugees (American Sanctuary Movement). Its headquarters were in Washington, D.C., with offices in several other major United States cities. The Institute received funding from a nationwide network of grassroots donors, as well as organizations like the New World Foundation.

== Three Mile Island, Greensboro Massacre, American Sanctuary Movement ==
In 1979, Daniel Sheehan, Sara Nelson and many of the allies and architects of the Silkwood case gathered in Washington, D.C. to found The Christic Institute. Over the next 12 years, as General Counsel for the Institute, Sheehan helped prosecute some of the most celebrated public interest cases of the time. Christic represented victims of the nuclear disaster at Three Mile Island.

They conducted a civil suit, seeking damages from KKK and American Nazi Party (ANP) members for the murder of five civil rights demonstrators in the Greensboro Massacre. In addition, they charged the city, certain police and four Federal agents with having known of the potential for violence and failing to protect the protesters. The jury awarded damages to the plaintiffs against the city, the police department, and the KKK and ANP.

The Institute defended Catholic workers providing sanctuary to Salvadoran refugees in the American Sanctuary Movement.

The graphic novel Brought to Light, by writers Alan Moore and Joyce Brabner, used material from lawsuits filed by the Christic Institute.

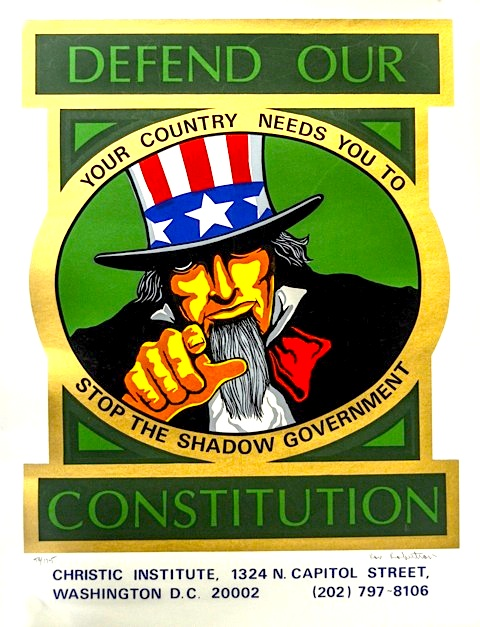
Christic Institute poster. Photo courtesy of their successor organization, the Romero Institute.

== Avirgan v. Hull ==
In 1986, the Christic Institute filed a $24 million civil suit on behalf of journalists Tony Avirgan and Martha Honey stating that various individuals were part of a conspiracy responsible for the La Penca bombing that injured Avirgan. The suit charged the defendants with illegally participating in assassinations, as well as arms and drug trafficking. Among the 30 defendants named were Iran–Contra figures John K. Singlaub, Richard V. Secord, Albert Hakim, and Robert W. Owen; Central Intelligence Agency officials Thomas Clines and Theodore Shackley; Contra leader Adolfo Calero; Medellin cartel leaders Pablo Escobar Gaviria and Jorge Ochoa Vasquez; Costa Rican rancher John Hull; and former mercenary Sam N. Hall.

On June 23, 1988, United States federal judge James Lawrence King of the United States District Court for the Southern District of Florida dismissed the case stating: "The plaintiffs have made no showing of existence of genuine issues of material fact with respect to either the bombing at La Penca, the threats made to their news sources or threats made to themselves." According to The New York Times, the case was dismissed by King at least in part due to "the fact that the vast majority of the 79 witnesses Mr. Sheehan cites as authorities were either dead, unwilling to testify, fountains of contradictory information or at best one person removed from the facts they were describing." On February 3, 1989, King ordered the Christic Institute to pay $955,000 in attorney's fees and $79,500 in court costs. The United States Court of Appeals for the Eleventh Circuit affirmed the ruling, and the Supreme Court of the United States let the judgment stand by refusing to hear an additional appeal. The fine was levied in accordance with “Rule 11” of the Federal Rules of Civil Procedure, which says that lawyers can be penalized for frivolous lawsuits.

On November 16 and 17, 1990, Bruce Springsteen, Bonnie Raitt, and Jackson Browne performed a benefit concert for the Christic Institute at the Shrine Auditorium while the case was on appeal before the Eleventh Circuit.

In the wake of the dismissal, Christic attorneys and Honey and Avirgan traded accusations over who was to blame for the failure of the case. Avirgan complained that Sheehan had handled matters poorly by chasing unsubstantiated "wild allegations" and conspiracy theories, rather than paying attention to core factual issues.

The Christic Institute was succeeded by the Romero Institute.

== Publications ==
- Brought To Light: Flashpoint - The La Penca Bombing. Introduction by Jonathan V. Marshall.
