= Anita McCormick Blaine =

American philanthropist and political activist

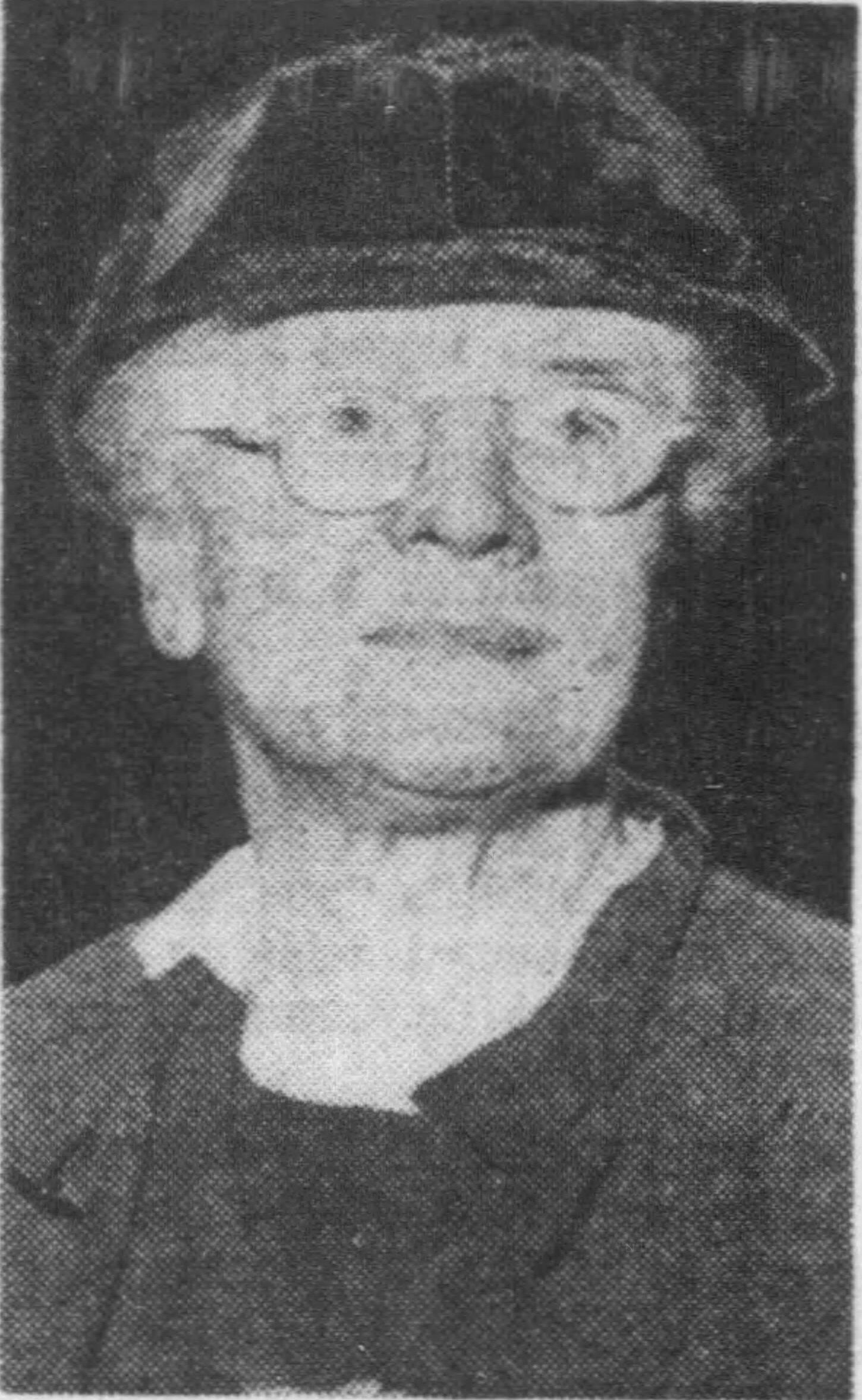
- Born: Anita Eugenie McCormick; July 4, 1866; Manchester, Bennington County, Vermont, USA
- Died: 1954 (aged 87–88); Chicago, Cook County, Illinois, USA
- Parent(s): Cyrus Hall McCormick; Nancy Fowler McCormick
- Relatives: See McCormick family

Anita Eugenie McCormick Blaine (1866-1954) was an American philanthropist and political activist. An heir to the McCormick Reaping Machine Works fortune built by her father, Cyrus McCormick (1809–1884), Blaine funded the launch of Chicago's Francis W. Parker Elementary School, the New World Foundation, the Progressive Party (1948), and the radical New York newspaper, the National Guardian.

== Biography ==
=== Early years ===
Anita Eugenie McCormick was born July 4, 1866, the fourth of seven children born to reaping machine inventor and industrialist Cyrus McCormick and Nancy Maria "Nettie" Fowler.

Working upon lessons learned from failed efforts by his father, the Virginia-born Cyrus McCormick had worked to construct a mechanical grain-harvesting device from an early age, fabricating his first crude machine in 1831, when he was just 22 years old. After putting down the project for a time, McCormick returned to refine his mechanical reaper in 1842, beginning to sell the first few commercial machines in that year. McCormick moved his operation to Chicago in 1848 and within five years was well on his way to becoming a prosperous industrialist. By the time of Anita's birth, the family fortune exceeded $4 million.

Anita was born in the East but the Great Chicago Fire of 1871 pulled the McCormicks back to Chicago to help rebuild the family franchise. Her early education was by means of private tutors. From her early teenage years, McCormick was educated at Misses Grant's Seminary, a conservative Presbyterian religious institution financially supported by McCormick and his fortune, and at Miss Kirkland's Academy, a pedagogically progressive, though economically elite private school, from which she graduated high school. Her enlightened ideas about education in later life seem to have begun there.

=== Educational activity ===
Spending much of her time in New York and Europe, Anita McCormick returned to Chicago in October 1887, in the wake of the Haymarket Affair and the growth of Hull House and the municipal reform movement. She became involved in the work of the Howe Street Mission, a philanthropic institution in which young and poorly educated working class women could gather in the evenings to learn sewing, cooking, and other skills and attend informational lectures.

McCormick felt that the instruction of the Howe Street Mission was largely ineffective and in 1888 she branched out to form a settlement house of her own, renting a nearby apartment building to serve as a meeting place for women and hiring a destitute widow to manage the facility. McCormick's new facility taught cooking and garment-making, and provided a library for reading as well as musical opportunities.

In 1880 Anita McCormick had met Emmons Blaine (1857-1892), a railroad executive and son of former Republican politician and presidential candidate James G. Blaine. The pair were married in September 1889, with the union between the politically prominent Blaine and wealthy McCormick clans making national society news. The couple had one child, a boy, Emmons Blaine, Jr. (1890-1918), prior to the senior Blaine's sudden death of an intestinal ailment at the age of 35.

In the 1890s, Anita McCormick Blaine's attention turned to public education, spurred by the forthcoming need of her own child to gain a competent, practical education. Blaine turned a room of her own house into a 10-student kindergarten in 1893, beginning the educational process of her 3-year-old son at home. She immediately began to look outward for further education, becoming acquainted with Francis Wayland Parker, an educational innovator whose Chicago Normal School trained young teachers in child-centered educational methods which emphasized "illustrative teaching" using pictures, models, and field trips as well as physical education and crafts over rote memorization methods.

Blaine was instrumental in establishing a school on Chicago's North Side based upon Parker's educational ideas and she would remain a patron of the educator, sponsoring a series of lectures by him in her living room and publishing the talks as an 1890 book, The School and Society. She would also come to sponsor a teachers' college in Chicago, making a nearly $30,000 commitment over a 5-year period. The effort would eventually be realized as the School of Education of the University of Chicago.

=== Peace activity ===
In the years after the conclusion of World War I, Blaine became a leading public advocate of the League of Nations as an international mechanism for the maintenance of world peace. Following the collapse of the League, Blaine was supportive of the foreign policy efforts of Franklin D. Roosevelt, based upon collective security against the spread of fascism.

Following World War II, Blaine was supportive of the United Nations as a world peace institution. She also became a leading financial benefactor of former Vice President Henry A. Wallace and his effort to launch the anti-Cold War Progressive Party.

=== Later years ===
In 1954 Anita McCormick Blaine launched a civil rights organization known as the New World Foundation with a $7 million behest. The organization was deeply involved in subsequent years in the effort to end racial segregation in the American South.

=== Death and legacy ===
Anita McCormick Blaine's papers are housed Wisconsin Historical Society Archives at the University of Wisconsin in Madison. The voluminous material, which includes Blaine's correspondence and writings, is incorporated in 939 archival boxes, 16 cartons, 9 bound volumes, and 1 oversized folio and is open to researchers for in-library use.
