= New World Foundation =

The New World Foundation is a left-wing foundation based in New York City. It supports organizations that work on behalf of civil rights and that seek to encourage participation of citizens in American democracy.

== History ==
It was founded in 1954 by Anita McCormick Blaine, a prominent member of the McCormick family and an heiress to industrialist Cyrus Hall McCormick and a supporter of Henry Wallace's 1948 presidential campaign. Its initial funding of about $20 million was noted for progress towards education, ethics, peace, and public health.

== Mission ==
During the early 1960s, the New World Foundation's goal was to aid education and promote better intergroup and international relations. In its mission statement, the New World Foundation stated as of 2009:

We see the strengths of progressive ideals and committed activists, who every day are inventing democracy and extending its boundaries. But we also know the strength of reaction, inaction, and injustice in blocking democracy’s advance. Our work and our tradition is to tip the balance, to add resources to the side of justice, to widen the channels for participation, and to ensure that another generation will see by example how they can make a difference.

== Activities ==
During the early 1970s, the Foundation supported various civil rights and community projects. Hillary Clinton, whom Marian Wright Edelman had mentored, was on the board from 1982 to 1988, and was its chair for some of that time, including 1987. During that time, the Foundation gave money to a variety of organizations active in civil rights and other New Left causes, including the Christic Institute, Grassroots International, Committee in Solidarity with the People of El Salvador (CISPES), FAIR, and the National Lawyers Guild. By the early 1990s, the foundation was giving money to a Silicon Valley group fighting consequences of computer industry toxins, all the while undergoing criticism for being invested in the likes of Louisiana Pacific, Nike, and Philip Morris.

== See also ==
- Lewis G. Morris House, also known as the New World Foundation Building
