= Thomas Polgar =

CIA officer (1922–2014)

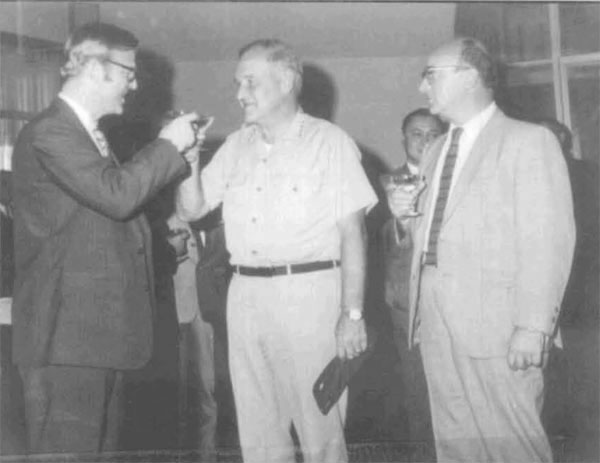
- Polgar (right) takes command of the CIA station in Saigon, January 1972. At left is former Station Chief Theodore Shackley, in the middle is General Creighton Abrams, head of the Military Assistance Command Vietnam (MACV)
- Born: July 24, 1922; Budapest, Kingdom of Hungary
- Died: March 22, 2014 (aged 91); Winter Park, Florida
- Military career
- Allegiance: Kingdom of Hungary; United States
- Branch: United States Army
- Unit: Office of Strategic Services
- Known for: CIA station chief at the United States Embassy, Saigon
- Conflicts: World War II
- Awards: Distinguished Intelligence Medal (2); State Department Award for Valor; Intelligence Star

Thomas Polgar (July 24, 1922 – March 22, 2014) was an American CIA officer who served as the Saigon, South Vietnam station chief from January 1972 until the Fall of Saigon in April 1975.

== Early years ==
Polgar was born on July 24, 1922, in Budapest, Kingdom of Hungary into a Jewish family.

He left Hungary in 1938 to study accounting at the Gaines School in New York. He graduated in 1942 but was unable to return to Hungary which had become part of the Axis powers. He wrote to First Lady of the United States, Eleanor Roosevelt explaining his situation and was soon naturalised as a U.S. citizen and drafted into the United States Army.

== Military and CIA career ==
As Polgar was fluent in several languages, he soon began working in the Office of Strategic Services. He was parachuted into occupied Europe and operated around Berlin in the late stages of World War II.

He moved to the Central Intelligence Agency (CIA) on its formation in 1947. He served as an aide to general Lucian Truscott who controlled European espionage operations.

During the 1950s, he conducted spying operations in Berlin. In the 1960s he was posted in Vienna and then at CIA headquarters in Langley, Virginia where he worked in the Latin American division. In 1970 he was posted as Station chief in Buenos Aires. While in Buenos Aires he helped end the hijacking of Braniff Flight 14 on July 2, 1971.

=== Vietnam ===
Despite having no previous Asian experience, in January 1972 he was appointed as CIA station chief in Saigon, South Vietnam taking over from Theodore Shackley. Director of Central Intelligence (DCI) Richard Helms, an old friend and colleague of Polgar's advised him that he would have four permanent items on his Saigon agenda, none of them operational. First was his relationship with the Embassy, after that, in no particular order, came Military Assistance Command, Vietnam (MACV), the media and Congressional visitors. In a pre-departure meeting with Secretary of Defense Melvin Laird, Laird advised Polgar that the U.S. role in South Vietnam was like that in West Germany and South Korea and Americans would be there for 40 years.

At the time of Polgar's appointment Saigon was the largest CIA station in the world and he oversaw a network of more than 550 field officers, including more than 200 undercover. The overall situation in South Vietnam appeared relatively stable, military operations in 1971 had bought time for Vietnamization of the war effort, rice production was up and the economy was booming, however there were signs that North Vietnam was planning a major offensive.

On March 30, 1972, the People's Army of Vietnam (PAVN) launched its long anticipated Easter Offensive. On April 6 Polgar wrote that:

The illusion that [the] war is over and we have won is shattered...American support in the air and in military and civilian advisory capacities remain essential for survival of a non-Communist Vietnam as long as Soviets and China continue support to North Vietnam.

In early May Polgar showed Ambassador Ellsworth Bunker an assessment that included a devastating critique of Army of the Republic of Vietnam (ARVN) commanders. Many owed their positions to their loyalty to President Nguyễn Văn Thiệu and were incompetent. The leadership had failed catastrophically to prepare for the attacks in Military Region 2, which included the Central Highlands, despite intelligence that predicted to the day when the attack there would come. Bunker forbade the dissemination of this report, but Polgar wrote to Langley that Bunker had genuinely appreciated it.

In mid-August 1972 National Security Adviser Henry Kissinger arrived in Saigon on the first of several visits aimed at winning Thiệu's support for the U.S. negotiating position at the Paris peace negotiations. Polgar had known Kissinger for 14 years and Kissinger gave him "full White House clearance" on the status of the talks.

In September 1972 CIA executive director William Colby wrote to Polgar urging him to develop a new political action strategy for South Vietnam. Polgar rejected Colby's request pointing out that the investment of billions of American dollars and a gigantic civilian effort had not resulted in U.S.-style political institutions taking root in South Vietnam and he called instead for "constant, generous, and sincere moral and material support to... President Thiệu, no matter what internal policies he pursues, as long as [these] do not damage fundamental U.S. interests." Arguing that democracy was too antipathetic to the Vietnamese tradition to constitute a real alternative, Polgar thought the U.S. should abandon what he called the "social reformist/missionary" resulting in a regime "more autocratic-not more democratic," but if this trend was accompanied by better security, the populace would welcome it. For Polgar, intermittent U.S. efforts to liberalize the South Vietnamese political system constituted a somewhat arbitrary end in themselves, essentially unrelated to the survival of South Vietnam.

In April 1973 Polgar accompanied Bunker on Thiệu's visit to President Richard Nixon at the "Western White House" in San Clemente, California. During this visit Polgar first met Bunker's replacement as Ambassador, Graham Martin. Polgar stated that Martin was concerned that he would undercut Martin with Kissinger, but that he assured Martin that as Chief of Station he worked for the Ambassador.

The presence of a Hungarian delegation on the International Commission of Control and Supervision (ICCS), the body responsible for overseeing the ceasefire implemented by the January 1973 Paris Peace Accords, saw Polgar targeted by Hungarian intelligence. At the same time Polgar's agents actively sought to recruit Hungarians on the ICCS.

In mid-1973 Polgar saw South Vietnamese forces as having gained at the expense of the North Vietnamese and the Vietcong (VC) in the six months since the Paris agreements. Saigon was "forging ahead and consolidating its control over most of the populated areas of South Vietnam." Generally speaking, "the VC didn't amount to anything." The essential point as Polgar saw it was that Nguyễn Cao Kỳ and then Thiệu had succeeded where their predecessors failed by establishing security and by offering the fundamentally apolitical peasant the prospect of improved living standards.

In July 1973 Martin arrived in Saigon and, according to Polgar, within months he was "clearly the Ambassador's closest confidante." As Martin never developed the close relationship Bunker had with Thiệu, that role was increasingly delegated to Polgar.

Polgar's year-end assessment for the Far East division stated that 1973 was a relatively good year for Saigon "certainly better than 1972" and as having seen an erosion of VC influence, Communist discomfort as the result of continuing ARVN pressure and economic difficulties in North Vietnam. He saw no possibility that Saigon could regain the military initiative, but he thought Hanoi genuinely interested in stabilizing the cease-fire agreement, and more concerned to preserve Communist assets in South Vietnam than to try now to overthrow Thiệu or to "achieve political control in Saigon by other means." The Saigon government, for its part, was constrained by Nixon's "debility in Washington," economic problems and a manpower shortage; it too "might welcome a respite from the very heavy burden of continuing fighting." The bottom line for Polgar was that "decisive changes in the military and geographic control are going to be minimal from here on... a coexistence must develop, peaceful or otherwise."

On August 9, 1974, the same day that Nixon resigned as a result of the Watergate scandal, Polgar sent Martin a threat estimate that stated that despite intensified military action, Hanoi showed no unambiguous signs of intending to tear up the Paris agreement and launch an offensive on the scale of 1968 or 1972. To this Polgar added a prescient qualification that "Recent intelligence suggests that the 'decisive blow' which they have been contemplating may come sooner than later, perhaps in the dry season of 1975."

On September 17, 1974, Polgar met with Thiệu and as usual the subject of military aid arose. Polgar explained the implications of the approaching U.S. midterm elections. Concerned about Saigon's "public relations problem" in the U.S., he urged Thiệu to abstain from agitating in Washington for additional aid. Thiệu expressed more anxiety about the continuing reliability of American military aid than about the precise amount.

On November 8, 1974, the CIA obtained a copy of Central Office for South Vietnam Resolution 75 which stated that the North was determined to launch an all-out offensive in 1975 which might be more intense than the 1972 Easter Offensive.

On April 25, 1975, Polgar arranged the transport of former President Thiệu to Tan Son Nhat International Airport where Thiệu boarded an Air America plane that took him into exile in Taiwan.

In his last day in Saigon Polgar oversaw the destruction of classified materials and before destroying the station's cable machine he wrote a final message from the U.S. Embassy which read:

This will be final message from Saigon station. It has been a long and hard fight and we have lost. This experience, unique in the history of the United States, does not signal necessarily the demise of the United States as a world power. The severity of the defeat and the circumstances of it, however, would seem to call for a reassessment of the policies of niggardly half-measures which have characterized much of our participation here despite the commitment of manpower and resources, which were certainly generous. Those who fail to learn from history are forced to repeat it. Let us hope that we will not have another Vietnam experience and that we have learned our lesson. Saigon signing off.

Polgar was evacuated on one of the last helicopters from the U.S. Embassy at 04:40 on May 1, 1975.

=== Post Vietnam ===
Polgar claims that the CIA ordered its employees not to speak of the fall of South Vietnam. In 1977 Polgar's subordinate Frank Snepp wrote his book Decent Interval giving his perspective of the Fall of Saigon without the approval of the CIA. Snepp criticised Polgar as indulging Ambassador Graham Martin's overoptimistic view of likelihood of the survival of South Vietnam and the possibility of negotiations to end the North Vietnamese assault. Polgar said that while he held Snepp "in the highest regard... what he’s giving is the private’s view of the war."

In 1976 he was appointed station chief in Mexico City. He then served as station chief in Bonn, West Germany. He retired from the CIA in 1981. For his service he was awarded the Distinguished Intelligence Medal twice, the State Department Award for Valor and the CIA Intelligence Star.

== Later life and death ==
Following his retirement, he worked as a consultant on defense and counterterrorism, and he also served as an investigator on the Senate select committee examining the Iran–Contra affair.

Polgar died at his home in Winter Park, Florida aged 91.
