= Payam-e Emrooz =

Before being shut down in 2000 by the Iranian Judiciary System, Payam-e Emrooz was the most professional monthly magazine with news and analyses in the areas of politics, society, culture, and economy. The magazine was headquartered in Tehran. Its existence was a symbol of the "freedom of press" in a country with its own specific political system. The magazine had considerable number of advertisements by foreign companies and institutes and a large number of Iranian students, intellectuals, and middle-class people (in addition to state officials) among its readers. Mohammad Zahedi-Asl was the license-holder and the responsible manager, and Amid Naeini was the editor in chief of the magazine. "The Exclusive Report" was one of the most popular and informative parts of each edition. It was a literary account of the most important political happenings during the previous month written by Massoud Behnoud, a pioneer of literary writing in modern Iranian journalism. Having been close to some officials and having had first-hand information on some occasions plus unique photojournalism, had made "The Exclusive Report" an exceptionally popular section of the magazine.
