= Theodore Shackley =

CIA officer

Theodore George Shackley, Jr.
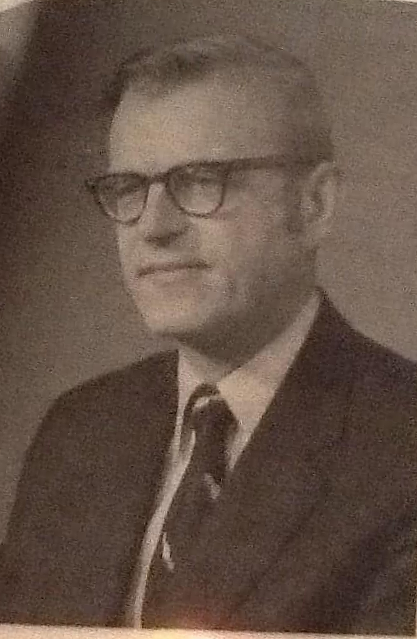
- Born: July 16, 1927; West Palm Beach, Florida, U.S.
- Died: December 9, 2002 (aged 75); Bethesda, Maryland, U.S.
- Other name: Andrew K. Reuteman
- Alma mater: University of Maryland
- Military career
- Branch: United States Army; Central Intelligence Agency
- Service years: 1945–1953 (Army); 1953–1979 (CIA)
- Rank: Second Lieutenant (Army); Paramilitary Operations Officer (CIA)
- Units: U.S. Army: U.S. Army Counterintelligence; Central Intelligence Agency: Special Activities Division
- Conflicts: Vietnam War

Theodore George "Ted" Shackley, Jr. (July 16, 1927 – December 9, 2002) was an American CIA officer involved in many important and controversial CIA operations during the 1960s and 1970s. He is one of the most decorated CIA officers. Due to his "light hair and mysterious ways", Shackley was known to his colleagues as "the Blond Ghost".

In the early 1960s, Shackley's work included being station chief in Miami, during the period of the Cuban Missile Crisis, as well as the Cuban Project (also known as Operation Mongoose), which he directed. He was also said to be the director of the "Phoenix Program" during the Vietnam War, as well as the CIA station chief in Laos between 1966 and 1968, and Saigon station chief from 1968 through February 1972. In 1976, he was appointed Associate Deputy Director for Operations, second in charge of CIA covert operations.

== Early years ==
Shackley was born on July 16, 1927, and raised in West Palm Beach, Florida. He enlisted in the U.S. Army on October 23, 1945, at Springfield, Massachusetts as a private, eventually becoming part of the Allied Occupation Force in Germany on completion of basic training. Due to his knowledge of the Polish language (his mother was a Polish immigrant), he became a recruit of U.S. Army Counterintelligence (ACI). As an army recruit he studied at the University of Maryland, and returned to Germany as a 2nd Lieutenant in 1951. Again he served as a member of Army Counterintelligence, where his linguistic skills were used in the recruitment of Polish agents. It was at this time that he was recruited by the CIA, and in 1953 he was assigned to work under William King Harvey at the CIA's Berlin Base. In 1961, Shackley married Hazel Tindol Shackley of Bethesda. He was previously married to Elizabeth Ann Brown, whom he left for his secretary.

== Miami and the Cuban crisis ==
During the period (1962–1965), Shackley was station chief in Miami, Florida. While heading the CIA office (known as "JMWAVE") shortly after the 1961 Bay of Pigs Invasion, Shackley dealt with operations in Cuba (alongside Edward Lansdale). JMWAVE employed more than 200 CIA officers, who handled approximately 2,000 Cuban agents. These included the famous "Operation Mongoose" (aka "The Cuban Project"). The aim of this was to "help Cubans (exiles) overthrow the Communist regime" (of Fidel Castro Ruz). During this period as Miami Station Chief, Shackley was in charge of about 400 agents and general operatives (as well as a huge flotilla of boats), and his tenure there encompassed the Cuban Missile Crisis of October 1962. Shackley's alias was Andrew K. Reuteman while JMWAVE chief.

== Vietnam, Laos, and the "Phoenix Program" ==
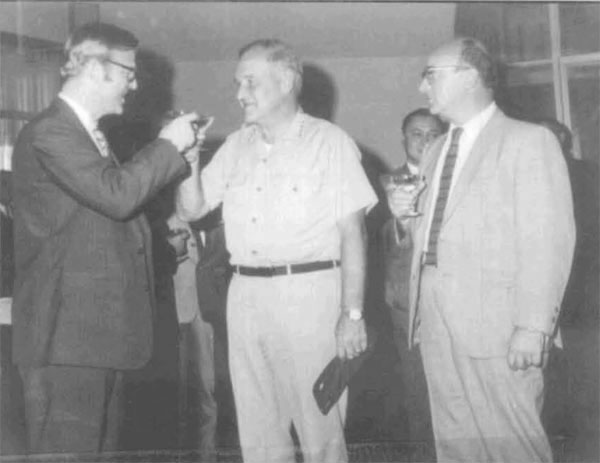
Thomas Polgar (far right) takes command of the CIA station in Saigon, January 1972. At left is former Station Chief Ted Shackley, heading back to a new assignment in Washington. In the middle is General Creighton Abrams, head of the Military Assistance Command Vietnam (MACV).

In 1966, Shackley moved on to the Vietnam War, becoming the CIA station chief in Laos between 1966 and 1968, where he directed the CIA's secret war against the North Vietnamese forces in Laos. He also helped coordinate local army efforts against the Pathet Lao and North Vietnamese Army in the northern regions of Laos. In late 1968, he then moved to Saigon to become station chief for Vietnam. Shackley was responsible for running the Phoenix Program and the Provincial Reconnaissance Units (PRUs), a secret assassination and capture campaign aimed at members of the Viet Cong infrastructure. However, in his memoirs Shackley claimed that he had not been the mastermind of the Phoenix Program (which had already started before his arrival in Saigon) and did not approve of it, given its disappointing effectiveness in producing intelligence material and "its poor press image" of being an assassination program rather than one for information procurement. In November 1969, he decided a six-months "phase-out" of CIA's involvement in the program before transferring it under South Vietnamese control, CIA agents being replaced by CORDS personnel.

Shackley served in South Vietnam through February 1972 when he returned to Langley, Virginia. According to Thomas Bodenheimer and Robert Gould, Shackley was linked to the Australian Nugan Hand Bank where heroin trade profits worth millions of dollars were transferred to after the Fall of Saigon in 1975.

== Western Hemisphere Division and Chile ==
From May 1972, Shackley ran the CIA's "Western Hemisphere Division". When Shackley took over the division, one mission for him was "regime change" in Chile (United States intervention in Chile / Project FUBELT).

During this time, Shackley also dealt with the case of ex-CIA officer Philip Agee, who was suspected of having defected to Cuban intelligence. Agee had told acquaintances that he was going to write an exposé of the CIA (published in 1975 as Inside The Company: CIA Diary). Shackley managed to get a copy of Agee's book before it was published, and according to journalist David Corn, even arranged for Agee to receive a bugged typewriter.

== Associate Deputy Director for Operations ==
In May 1976, Shackley was made Associate Deputy Director for Operations, serving under CIA director George H. W. Bush. After Jimmy Carter had succeeded Gerald Ford as President and replaced Bush with Stansfield Turner, Shackley was relieved of his post in December 1977, before officially retiring from the organization in 1979 – when the Carter administration announced wide cuts in the CIA's network of officers and informants. Reportedly, he was forced out of the CIA by Turner who disapproved of Shackley's involvement with former officer Edwin P. Wilson, who was under federal investigation for smuggling explosives to Libya.

Shackley was suspected by federal prosecutor Lawrence Barcella to be part of Wilson's Egyptian-American Transport and Services Corporation (EATSCO), a front for his arms smuggling which was also accused of fraudulently billing the Department of Defense. At that time, Shackley claimed that he would have become CIA director if President Gerald Ford had been reelected in 1976 and that only this investigation kept him from becoming CIA director or deputy director under new president Ronald Reagan. In 1982, Wilson was convicted for selling 22 tons of C4 plastic explosive to Muammar al-Gaddafi's Libya, and also on the charge of exporting guns. On October 29, 2003, the conviction on the explosives charge was reversed.

== Iran–Contra affair ==
On February 5, 1987, Shackley was interviewed by the Tower Commission investigating the Iran–Contra affair. Shackley reported that he met with General Manucher Hashemi, the former head of SAVAK's counterintelligence division, in Hamburg, West Germany, in November 1984. There, Hashemi introduced Shackley to Manucher Ghorbanifar, stating that Ghorbanifar's contacts in Iran were "fantastic". Ghorbanifar, known to the CIA as a person of questionable reliability and veracity, attempted to show that he and Hashemi had influence in Iran by stating that the Iranians would be willing to trade captured Soviet equipment for TOW missiles. Ghorbanifar also proposed that a cash payment be offered as ransom for the four American hostages held in Beirut, Lebanon (which included William Francis Buckley (Note: Vernon Walters did not respond to or resolve the problem of William Francis Buckley's capture, who was later tortured to death by the Iranians.)) and that he act as the intermediary. Shackley stated that Ghorbanifar presented a deadline of December 7, 1984.

Shackley prepared a memorandum regarding the proposal and sent it to General Vernon A. Walters with the United States Department of State. According to Shackley, the State Department responded, stating that they would attempt to solve the problem through other channels. In May 1985, Shackley discussed the hostage issue with Michael Ledeen and shared that he had received no response from Walters regarding the report he had prepared regarding the November meeting with Ghorbanifar. Ledeen asked for a copy of the report and stated that others were still interested in investigating the hostage issue. In June, Shackley prepared an updated second report that outlined a similar proposal from Ghorbanifar in which he suggested a "discussion of a quid pro quo that involved items other than money." He gave the report to Ledeen, who forwarded it to Oliver North, the staff officer on the National Security Council responsible for counter-terrorism. The report outlined a similar proposal from Ghorbanifar in which he suggested a "discussion of a quid pro quo that involved items other than money." It also received no response.

On February 2, 1987, The Washington Post printed an article from Shackley in which he countered allegations that he was involved in the arms for hostages deal. After detailing his encounter with Ghorbanifar in Hamburg and the nature of his reports to the State Department and Ledeen, he wrote: "When anyone asserts that my intervention on behalf of the hostages shows that I must also have participated in the transfer of weapons to Iran and, therefore, must have helped supply the contras with funds, material or arms, I can only gape in amazement and conclude that there are those who have studied logic from a different textbook than I did. To make it plain, I have never played a role in any aspect of the transaction that led to an exchange of weapons for hostages, nor have I been a participant in any activities on behalf of the contras." Shackley concluded his statement: "I was not a participant in the Iran weapons transfer; I was not in the past, nor am I now, involved in providing aid of any kind of the contras; and I completely endorse the position that no U.S. intelligence operation that is in violation of an act of Congress should be undertaken."

== Christic Institute lawsuit ==
In 1986, Shackley was named as one of thirty defendants in a $24 million civil lawsuit filed by attorney Daniel Sheehan's Christic Institute. The suit claimed Shackley was part of a conspiracy responsible for the La Penca bombing, and a number of other covert operations.

Similar charges were made in a 1987 letter from the Burmese warlord Khun Sa to the U.S. Justice Department. The letter, which was transmitted by James "Bo" Gritz, accused Shackley of organizing heroin smuggling from the Golden Triangle in the 1960s and 70s.

In 1988, the United States District Court for the Southern District of Florida dismissed the Christic suit, after finding it to be frivolous and ordered the Institute to pay $955,000 in attorneys fees and $79,500 in court costs. The ruling was subsequently upheld by the United States Court of Appeals for the Eleventh Circuit and the Supreme Court of the United States.

== Death ==
Shackley died from cancer at his home in Bethesda, Maryland. He was 75 years old.

== Bibliography ==
- Theodore Shackley (1981). The Third Option: An American View of Counter-insurgency Operations. New York: McGraw-Hill. ISBN 0070563829.
- Theodore Shackley and Richard A. Finney (1992). Spymaster: My life in the CIA. Nebraska: Potomac Books. ISBN 157488915X.
- David Corn (1994). Blond Ghost: Ted Shackley and the CIA's Crusades. New York: Simon & Schuster ISBN 0671695258.
