= Tony Avirgan and Martha Honey =

Former American journalists

Tony Avirgan and Martha Honey are a married couple and former journalistic duo who reported on the 1979 Uganda–Tanzania War and Central America in the 1980s. They were unsuccessful plaintiffs in Avirgan v. Hull (1986), a civil suit alleging responsibility for the La Penca bombing, which injured Avirgan. Philip Chrimes credits Honey with, "perhaps more than any other journalist, help[ing] to blow the cover on the illegal North-Secord Contra resupply operation". Journalist Ed Hooper described Avirgan and Honey's book War in Uganda: The Legacy of Idi Amin as an "outstanding eyewitness account" and an "excellent source" on the Uganda–Tanzania War.

Their son, Jody Avirgan, is also a journalist.

== Awards ==
In 1988, Honey received a Centre for Investigative Journalism Award in the Radio category for an Iran-Contra story that aired the year before on Sunday Morning on CBC Radio.

== Works ==
- Avirgan, Tony; Honey, Martha (1983). War in Uganda: The Legacy of Idi Amin. Tanzania Publishing House. ISBN 978-9976-1-0056-3.
- Avirgan, Tony; Honey, Martha, eds. (1987). La Penca: On Trial in Costa Rica : the CIA Vs. the Press. Editorial Porvenir. ISBN 978-9977-944-16-6.
- Honey, Martha (1994). Hostile Acts: U.S. Policy in Costa Rica in the 1980s. University Press of Florida. ISBN 978-0-8130-1250-6.
- Honey, Martha (1999). Ecotourism and Sustainable Development: Who Owns Paradise?. Island Press. ISBN 978-1-55963-582-0.
