= La Penca bombing =

1984 bombing in Nicaragua

Coordinates: 11.5149°N 85.9666°W

The La Penca bombing was a bomb attack carried out on May 30, 1984, at the remote outpost of La Penca, on the Nicaraguan side of the border with Costa Rica, along the San Juan River. It occurred during a press conference convened and conducted by Edén Pastora, who at the time was the leader of a Contra guerrilla group fighting against the ruling Sandinista regime in Nicaragua. Pastora, the presumed target of the attack, survived the bombing, but seven other people were killed, including three journalists, and several others were severely injured. The bombing was carried out by an operative posing as a news photographer and is considered a serious violation of journalistic neutrality during an armed conflict, like the assassination in 2001 of Afghan leader Ahmad Shah Massoud by Al-Qaeda agents posing as international journalists.

In the years after the event, some journalists and activists, as well as the Costa Rican judiciary, pointed to the United States government's Central Intelligence Agency (CIA), which was seeking to direct the Contra insurgency against the leftist Sandinista regime in Nicaragua, as responsible for the bombing. However, in 1993 the man who had placed the bomb, and who had attended the press conference under a false identity as a Danish photographer named Per Anker Hansen, was revealed to have been an Argentine leftist whose real name was Vital Roberto Gaguine and who had died in 1989 during a guerrilla attack on a military base in Argentina.

In 2009, Swedish journalist and filmmaker Peter Torbiörnsson revealed that he had been asked by Renán Montero, a Cuban military counter-intelligence officer working with the Sandinista Ministry of the Interior, to meet in Costa Rica with the man posing as Hansen and to escort him to the press conference at La Penca. Torbiörnsson then attempted unsuccessfully to press charges in Nicaragua against Renán Montero, Lenín Cerna, and Tomás Borge (the Sandinista Minister of the Interior at the time of the bombing) for murder and crimes against humanity. In 2011 Torbiörnsson released a documentary film, Last Chapter, Goodbye Nicaragua, which includes footage of him personally confronting Borge over his role in the bombing.

== Attack ==
A press conference had been arranged in the guerrilla outpost of La Penca by Edén Pastora, a former Sandinista military commander who had switched allegiance to the Contras. The press conference took place in an enclosed hut on stilts, on the northern bank of the San Juan River that separates Costa Rica from Nicaragua. The event had been convened by Contra officials in the Costa Rican capital of San José. The journalists arrived at La Penca past nightfall, after traveling all day over land and by canoe from San José. Because of the late hour, Pastora initially asked that the press conference start on the following morning, but as the reporters began peppering the guerrilla leader with questions, an impromptu conference began and the reporters and television news crews gathered with Pastora around a chest-high table in the main room of the hut.

The bomb is believed to have been hidden in an aluminum camera case, planted by an individual carrying a stolen Danish passport issued under the name "Per Anker Hansen". Afterwards, survivors commented that they found it odd that "Hansen" had so zealously guarded his "camera equipment" by wrapping the unwieldy aluminum box in plastic. "Hansen" is believed to have deposited the camera case containing the bomb under the table. News footage showed the suspected bomber gesturing to his camera as if to indicate an equipment malfunction and then leaving the room. The bomber may have detonated the bomb remotely using a walkie-talkie signal. Seconds after "Hansen" left the room, an explosion ripped through the hut, leaving the injured and dying crying out in pain and calling for help in the darkness.

Those killed in the bombing were an American journalist, Linda Frazier; a Costa Rican cameraman, Jorge Quirós; his assistant, Evelio Sequeira; and four of Pastora's men. About a dozen other people were seriously wounded. Pastora was seriously injured in both legs. His injuries were severe enough that he had to receive skin grafts to the shins and thighs and regularly apply ointment to his wounds. Five months after the bombing, he still sometimes found pieces of wire and metal lodged in his skin. "Hansen", who was unhurt by the bombing, was taken to San José together with the other victims and soon disappeared.

== Investigations ==
The bombing led to an investigation by Tony Avirgan, an American journalist injured in the bombing, and his wife, Martha Honey, also a journalist. Both concluded that the CIA was responsible. In 1986, the Christic Institute filed a US$24-million lawsuit on their behalf against several individuals, all associated with Lt. Colonel Oliver North, including Rob Owen, John Hull, Richard Secord, Albert Hakim, and Thomas Clines. However, the case was thrown out in June 1988, and the Christic Institute was ordered to pay approximately $1 million in costs to the defendants.

In 1990, a Costa Rican examining magistrate accused the CIA of orchestrating the bombing by two intermediaries. Charges of murder were laid against Felipe Vidal, a Cuban-American CIA asset, and John Hull, an American farmer who lived in Costa Rica at the time and had been previously named in the Christic Institute lawsuit.

In 1993, Miami Herald reporter Juan Tamayo received a tip that a former member of Argentina's People's Revolutionary Army (ERP), who had defected and was living in Europe, had recognized news photographs of the suspected bomber as being of an ERP militant whom he had known by the codename Martín el inglés ("Martin the Englishman"). Freelance journalist Doug Vaughn, who was working for the Christic Institute, then established that the stolen Danish passport issued to Per Anker Hansen had been used to apply for a Panamanian visa, and he obtained the corresponding file from the Panamanian government, including a photograph and a right thumbprint. Argentine journalists then obtained Gaguine's fingerprints from the police, and Vaughn and Tamayo took the two sets of prints to a fingerprint expert in Miami, who found a perfect match. Vaughn showed newsphotos of Gaguine to the alleged bomber's brother and father, who confirmed the identification. According to Argentine journalists cited by Tamayo, Gaguine was among a group of guerrillas who were killed in the 1989 attack on La Tablada barracks.

After the bomber had been identified as Gaguine, Swedish journalist, filmmaker, and La Penca survivor Peter Torbiörnsson broke nine years of silence and revealed that he had known of "Hansen"'s ties with the Sandinistas before the bombing. Years later, in 2009, Torbiörnsson admitted publicly that, in spite of his work as an ostensibly objective international journalist, at the time of the incident at La Penca he sympathized strongly with the Sandinista cause. The chief of Sandinista counter-intelligence, a Cuban military officer named Renán Montero, introduced Torbiörnsson to "Hansen" in Managua. At Montero's request, Torbiörnsson took "Hansen" under his wing and provided journalistic cover as the two traveled through northern Costa Rica to attend Pastora's press conference. Torbiörnsson explained that, at the time, he realized that his travel companion was a Sandinista spy, but did not suspect that he was an assassin.

Tormented by the idea that he had been used as an unwitting accomplice to a terrorist attack and disillusioned with the Sandinistas, Torbiörnsson traveled to Managua in January 2009 and submitted a declaration to Nicaraguan police in which he pointed to Montero, to former Sandinista Minister of Interior Comandante Tomás Borge, and to former chief of Nicaraguan state security Lenín Cerna as the masterminds of the bombing. Torbiörnsson also made a documentary film, Last Chapter, Goodbye Nicaragua, which premiered in the 2011 DocsBarcelona International Film Festival and in which he renewed his accusation that Sandinista leaders Borge, Cerna, and Montero had planned and ordered the bombing. The film includes an interview with Luis Carrión, who was Borge's deputy at the Nicaraguan Ministry of the Interior at the time of the bombing, in which Carrión declares that he learned shortly after the events of La Penca that the bombing had been an operation carried out by that Ministry's intelligence directorate. Torbiörnsson also claimed that Nicaraguan President Daniel Ortega admitted to him five years after the attack that the bombing had been orchestrated by his government, but that Ortega later chose to cover it up and obtain Pastora's silence and co-operation by giving Pastora a position in the second Sandinista administration.
