= Riven Rock, Montecito =

Subdivision in Santa Barbara, California

Coordinates: 34.444°N 119.6460°W

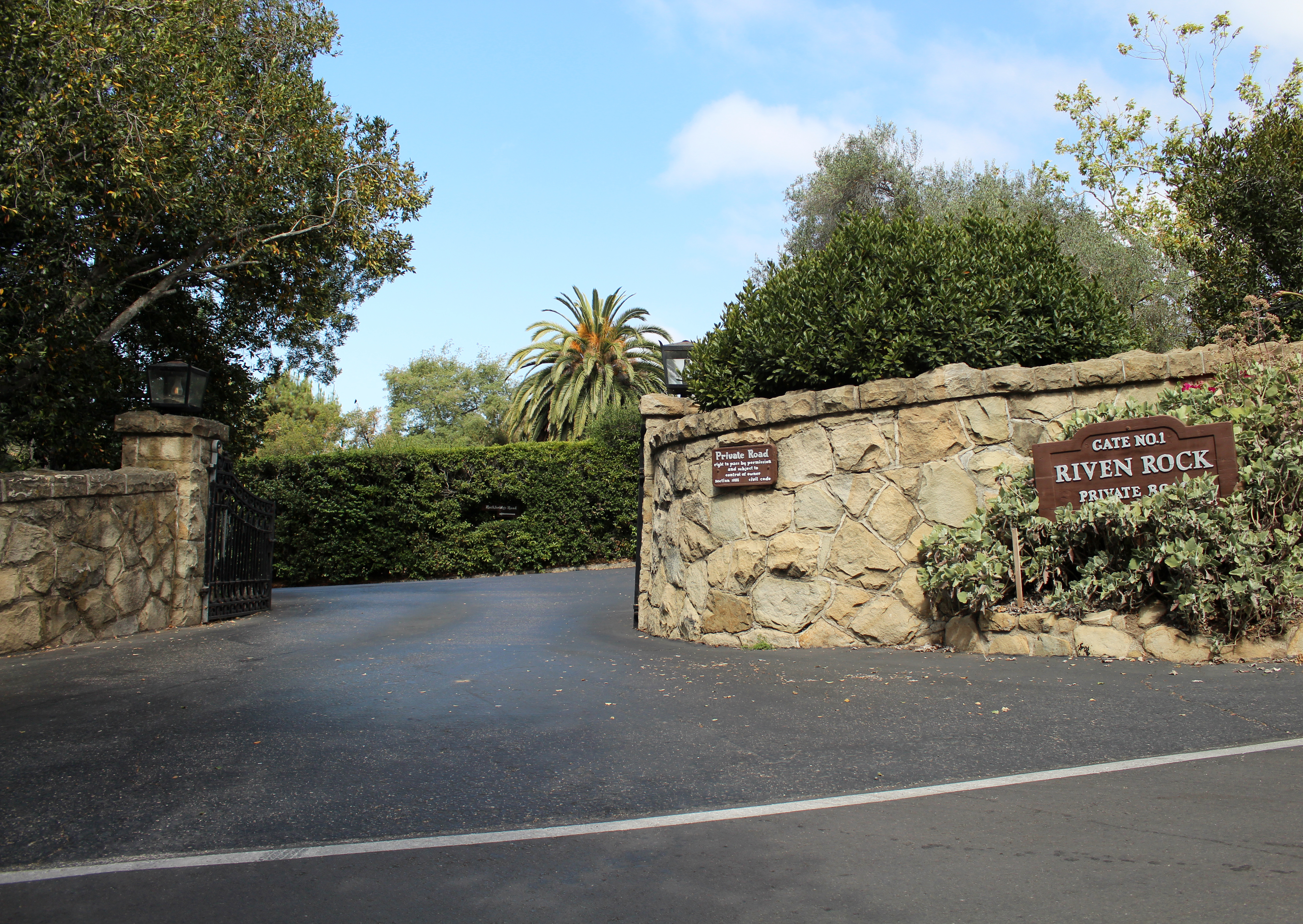
Gate No. 1, Riven Rock

Riven Rock is a residential subdivision in the unincorporated area of Montecito, California near Santa Barbara, California. The Riven Rock subdivision is located on the former Riven Rock Estate.

== History ==
The Riven Rock Estate was owned by the McCormick family, who purchased the 84-acre (34 ha) property in 1896 and built a large, two-story Mission Revival home on the premises two years later. The estate's name came from an oak tree near the main gate, which was growing out of and had split a large boulder. Stanley McCormick, the youngest child of Cyrus Hall McCormick and Nancy Fowler McCormick, and husband of Katharine McCormick, was confined for much of his life at the estate as he suffered from schizophrenia. Stanley McCormick's life was the basis of T.C. Boyle's 1998 novel Riven Rock.

After the 1925 Santa Barbara earthquake the main house was demolished. After Stanley McCormick's death in 1947, Katharine sold the estate in 1949 to a real estate developer, who sold it to another in 1950. The second one subdivided the estate into 34 smaller parcels and put them up for sale.

In 2020, Meghan, Duchess of Sussex and Prince Harry, Duke of Sussex, after deciding to withdraw from royal family duties, purchased the French Provençal "Chateau of Riven Rock", which is located on the grounds of the old Riven Rock Estate. The 7-acre (2.8 ha), 18,671-square-foot (1,734.6 m^{2}) residence was purchased from the Russian oligarch Sergey Grishin for latex 14.6 million.

== See also ==
• Riven Rock – a 1998 novel by T.C. Boyle
