= East Is East =

East Is East may refer to:

- "East is East", a quotation from Rudyard Kipling's poem "The Ballad of East and West"
- East Is East (1916 film), a 1916 British silent film
- East Is East (novel), a 1990 novel by T.C. Boyle
- East Is East (play), a 1996 play by Ayub Khan-Din, produced by Tamasha Theatre Company
  - East Is East (1999 film), a 1999 BAFTA Award-winning film based on the play
