= McCormick reaper =

Agricultural implement

The McCormick reaper is an agricultural implement that was made in the 19th century by the McCormick Harvesting Machine Company in Chicago. The reaper cut grain such as wheat much faster than was possible with hand tools, and improved farm productivity in the 19th century. The McCormick Harvesting Machine Company became part of the International Harvester Company in 1902.

== Invention ==
Cyrus McCormick and his company insisted he be credited as the single inventor of the mechanical reaper. He was, however, one of several blacksmiths who produced working models in the 1830s. His efforts built on more than two decades of tinkering by his father Robert McCormick, with the aid of Jo Anderson, an enslaved African-American man held by the family. Cyrus successfully developed a modern company, with manufacturing, international marketing, and a sales force to sell his reapers and other farm tools.

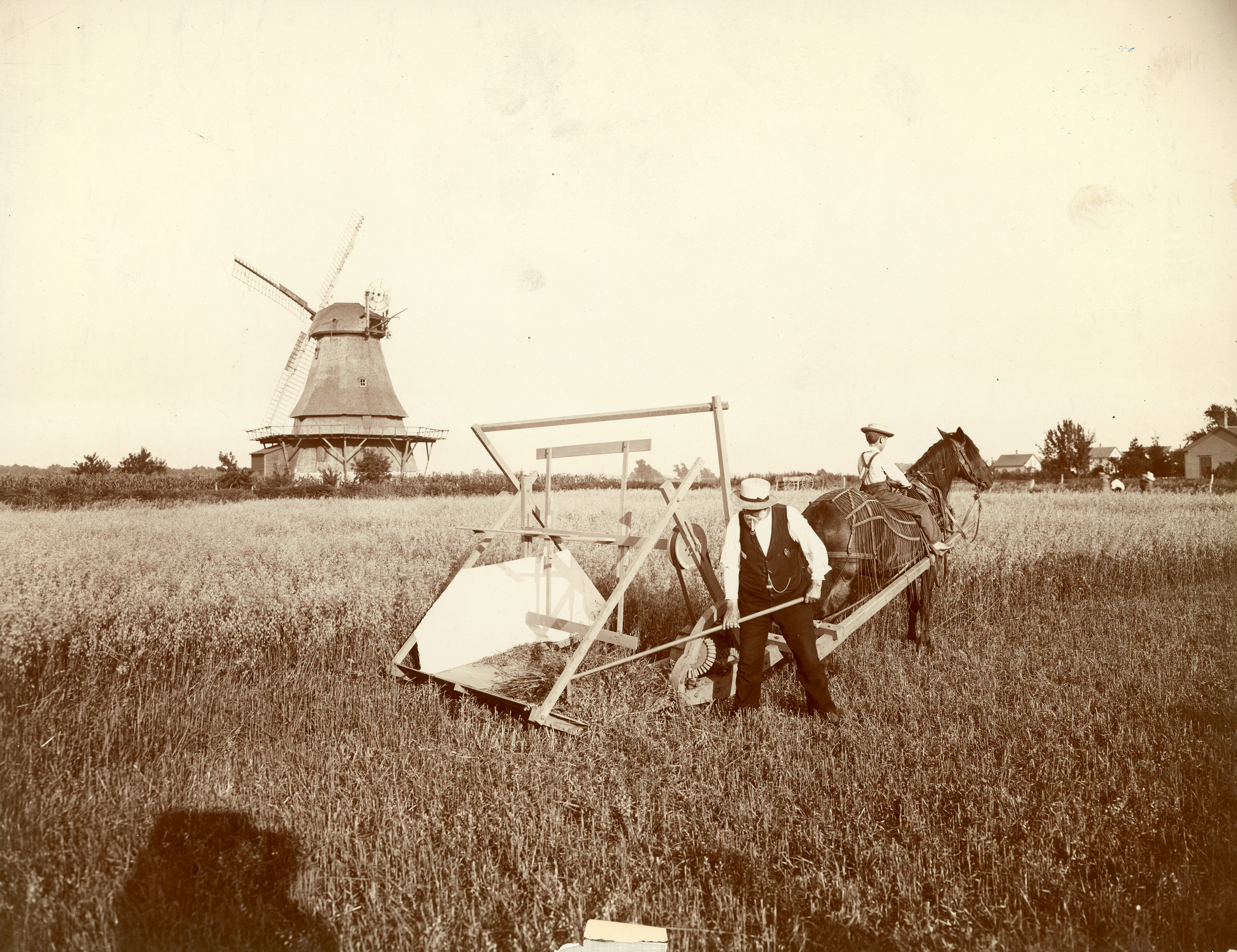
McCormick's reaper

The McCormick reaper was designed by Robert in Walnut Grove, Virginia. However, Robert became frustrated when he was unable to perfect his idea. His son Cyrus worked to complete the project, who obtained a patent for "The McCormick Reaper" in 1834.

The McCormick reaper of 1834 had several key elements:

- a main wheel frame
- projected to the side a platform containing a cutter bar having fingers through which reciprocated a knife driven by a crank
- upon the outer end of the platform was a divider projecting ahead of the platform to separate the grain to be cut from that to be left standing
- a reel was positioned above the platform to hold the grain against the reciprocating knife to throw it back upon the platform
- the machine was drawn by a team walking at the side of the grain.
- The parts were all custom made by blacksmiths and were not identical.

Many 19th century inventors claimed innovation in mechanical reapers. The various designs competed with each other and were the subject of multiple lawsuits. McCormick's chief rival was Obed Hussey who patented a reaper in 1833, the Hussey Reaper. Made in Baltimore, Maryland, Hussey's design was a major improvement in reaping efficiency. The reaper only required two horses working in a non-strenuous manner, a man to work the machine, and another man to drive. In addition, the Hussey Reaper left an even and clean surface after its use.

McCormick claimed that his reaper was actually invented in 1831, giving him the best claim to the general design of a working reaper. Over the next few decades the Hussey and McCormick reapers competed with each other in the marketplace, despite being quite similar. By the 1850s, the original patents of both Hussey and McCormick had expired, and many other manufacturers put similar machines on the market.

In 1861, the United States Patent and Trademark Office issued a ruling on the invention of the polarizing reaper design. It was determined that the profits made from reapers were in large part due to Hussey. It was ruled that the heirs of Hussey would be monetarily compensated for his work and innovation by those who had made money from the reaper. It was also ruled that McCormick's reaper patent would be renewed for another seven years.

== Competitive reapers ==
Although the McCormick reaper was a revolutionary innovation for the harvesting of crops, it did not experience mainstream success and acceptance until at least 20 years after it was patented. This was because the McCormick reaper lacked a quality unique to Hussey's reaper, which used a sawlike cutter bar that cut stalks far more effectively than McCormick's. Only once McCormick was able to acquire the rights to Hussey's cutter-bar mechanism (around 1850) did a truly revolutionary machine emerge. Other factors in the gradual uptake of mechanized reaping included natural cultural conservatism among farmers (proven tradition versus new and unknown machinery); the poor state of many new farm fields, which were often littered with rocks, stumps, and areas of uneven soil, making the lifespan and operability of a reaping machine questionable; and some amount of fearful Luddism among farmers that the machine would take away jobs, most especially among hired manual labourers.

Another strong competitor in the industry was the Manny reaper by John Henry Manny and the companies that succeeded him. Even though McCormick has sometimes been simplistically credited as the [sole] "inventor" of the mechanical reaper, a more accurate statement is that he independently reinvented aspects of it, created a crucial original integration of enough aspects to make a successful whole, and benefited from the influence of more than two decades of work by his father, as well as the aid of Jo Anderson.

== Making and selling reapers ==
The McCormicks had a small blacksmith shop in Virginia that produced only a few machines. Cyrus McCormick contracted with other small shops to build and sell machines. Finally he moved his operation to Chicago in 1847 and did all his own manufacturing. Chicago was much closer to the wheat market, especially after the national railway system became centered there.

Cyrus travelled widely across the U.S., Canada and Europe to publicize the reaper with advertising and demonstrations, and he set up local offices to handle sales and repair work. He launched or defended multiple lawsuits in federal courts regarding patent law. He did very well in the Midwest and West; competition was stiff in the East. There were few sales in the South, which after the Civil War was impoverished and had too much surplus labor. Europe was highly impressed and gave the reaper many technology awards, but farms were small and had little need for a reaper. His younger brothers took charge in Chicago: Leander J. McCormick, a blacksmith, supervised manufacturing, and William Sanderson McCormick handled bookkeeping and payroll.

Regarding the labor needed to produce one bushel of wheat, the U.S. Department of Agriculture found a 95% decline in the time needed, thanks to mechanization:

1894 being compared with 1830, the required human labor declined from three hours and three minutes to ten minutes. The heavy, clumsy plow of 1830 had given way to the disk plow that both plowed and pulverized the soil in the same operation; hand sowing had been displaced by the mechanical seeder drawn by horses; the cradling and thrashing with flails and hand winnowing had given way to reaping, thrashing, and sacking with the combined reaper and thrasher drawn by horses.

In 1868 demand for harvesting equipment was enormous, and McCormick sold 8,000 reapers. A new model, the "Advance," replaced the original "Reliable." The Chicago factory employed 800 men, with little union activity except for the moulders. Disaster hit in October 1871 when the Great Chicago Fire destroyed the factory and 2,000 completed machines. The company lost $1.4 million, with insurance covering only a fourth of the loss. The records were all saved, and some of the machinery. After the losses, McCormick was still worth $5 or $6 million. He determined to rebuild bigger and better than before. A new larger factory was opened on the south side of Chicago in January 1873 at a cost of $2 million. Its 700 workers built 15,000 reapers per year that sold for $150, with a profit margin of about $50.

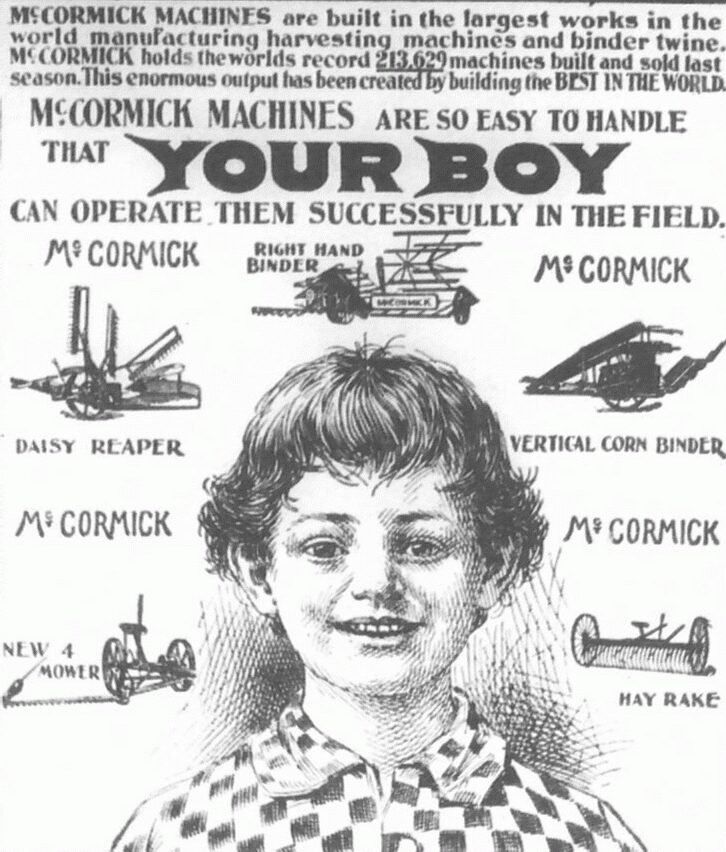
1900 ad for McCormick farm machines—"Your boy can operate them"

The three McCormick brothers feuded endlessly. William died young, and in 1880 Cyrus finally bought Leander out. He put his son Cyrus McCormick Jr. in charge as they made the key decision to automate the factories with new machinery. Instead of highly paid blacksmiths building one reaper at a time, the factory used semi-skilled laborers to help the machines turn out identical parts and make low-cost mass production possible. Indeed about nine of ten factory workers were common laborers paid $1.50 per day. In 1882 the factory produced 46,000 reapers.

== Merging into International Harvester ==
The nationwide economic depression of 1893–1896 depressed sales, although lawsuits remained a major burden. The leading reaper companies started informal talks when they realized that the lawsuits hurt every player. The solution was for the major companies to combine, and thereby end the ruinous lawsuits and the expensive competition. They approached Wall Street where the big names—Morgan and Rockefeller—were indeed interested. The result was the formation of International Harvester in 1902, coordinated by George Walbridge Perkins of J.P. Morgan & Co.. It bought out the five largest reaper companies in 1902 for $150 million: McCormick Harvesting Machine Company and Deering Harvester Company, as well as three smaller manufacturers: Milwaukee; Plano; and Warder, Bushnell, and Glessner (makers of Champion brand). The result was the fourth largest corporation in the United States.

After a few more years of squabbling, the young International Harvester became a near monopoly in reapers and a major factor in many other farm implements. In 1908 it made 700,000 harvesters worldwide, for $73 million. In addition to 25,000 IH employees there were 42,000 working in its local agencies all over the U.S. and parts of Europe.

== See also ==
- Rural American history
