= Riven Rock =

1998 novel by T. Coraghessan Boyle

- US edition cover
- Author: T. C. Boyle
- Language: English
- Publisher: Viking Press
- Publication date: February 1, 1998
- Publication place: United States
- Media type: Print (Hardcover & Paperback)
- Pages: 496 p.
- ISBN: 0-670-87881-2

Riven Rock, published in 1998, is a novel by the American author T. Coraghessan Boyle. It concerns the life of Stanley McCormick, a son of Cyrus McCormick, inventor of the reaper, and Stanley's devoted wife, Katherine McCormick, daughter of Wirt Dexter, a prominent Chicago lawyer.

The novel is a work of fiction based on actual people.

The location of most of the story is Riven Rock, an estate located near Montecito, Santa Barbara County, California, and owned by the McCormick family. Stanley, having developed severe mental problems, is confined to the estate for the rest of his life, during which repeated attempts to cure him by various medical experts are to no avail.

Stanley and Katharine live largely separate lives. The reader comes to know Katharine slightly better than her husband, if only because she is a functioning member of society (albeit sexually deprived) whereas he is either catatonic or in a violent rage for much of the time. (He has been diagnosed as suffering from dementia praecox, among other conditions, his deepest fears—and hatreds—reserved for women.)

A third protagonist, Eddie O’Kane, is Stanley’s chief nurse throughout his stay at Riven Rock. O’Kane and his tumultuous relationships with women are described in numerous sections in the novel, forming a third storyline interwoven with those of Katharine and Stanley. Boyle thus ranges between accounts of high society (and its madnesses) and the alcoholism and romantic desperation of O’Kane, the Irish-American stiff.

The three parts of the novel parallel those times during which three different psychiatrists preside over Stanley’s care, a unique though essentially arbitrary division (because the main story continues virtually unchanged throughout). The first caretaker is Dr. Hamilton, who is more interested in studying the apes and monkeys, which he has brought to the estate in helping Stanley to improve. The second is Dr. Brush, something of a nonentity who quickly gives up on any prospect of saving the patient. The third is Dr. Kempf, a psychoanalyst who achieves some success in bringing Stanley around to being able to interact with women, including, after nearly twenty years, his wife Katharine. In the end, though, the patient reverts to abnormal behavior, and Katharine sues (unsuccessfully) in court to obtain full control over Stanley’s care (where for the duration she has shared it with the McCormicks).

Riven Rock probes male-female relationships, the nature of psychiatric care (as it existed in the early twentieth century), and the mix of classes and ethnicities that is modern America. It also shows, above all, how much is to be gained by giving literary treatment to historical characters and events—an exercise that Boyle repeats in The Women and other of his works.

== Book information ==
Riven Rock by T. C. Boyle

- Hardcover - ISBN 0-670-87881-2 (First edition, February 1, 1998) published by Viking Press
- Paperback - ISBN 0-14-027166-X (January 1, 1999) published by Penguin Books
