= The Harder They Come (disambiguation) =

The Harder They Come is a 1972 Jamaican crime film.

The Harder They Come may also refer to:

- The Harder They Come (novel), a 2015 novel by T. C. Boyle
- The Harder They Come (soundtrack), soundtrack to the film
  - "The Harder They Come" (song), a 1972 song by Jimmy Cliff

== See also ==
- The Harder They Fall (disambiguation)
