= Outside Looking In (novel) =

2019 novel by T. C. Boyle

- First edition
- Author: T. C. Boyle
- Language: English
- Publisher: Ecco Press
- Publication date: April 9, 2019
- Publication place: United States
- Media type: Print (hardcover)
- Pages: 400
- ISBN: 978-0062882981
- Preceded by: The Terranauts

Outside Looking In is a novel by American author T. C. Boyle. It was published on April 9, 2019. It takes place during the Harvard LSD experiments of the early 1960s. A version of Timothy Leary appears as a character, depicted as a "blend of cheerfulness and manipulation."

Outside Looking In received strong reviews. The Telegraph called Boyle "the undisputed master of what might be called biographical fiction."
