= When the Killing's Done =

2011 novel by T. C. Boyle

- First edition
- Author: T. C. Boyle
- Language: English
- Publisher: Viking Press
- Publication date: February 22, 2011
- Publication place: United States
- Media type: Print (hardcover)
- Pages: 384 pp
- ISBN: 978-0-670-02232-8

When the Killing's Done is a 2011 novel by T. C. Boyle. The book is an environmental and family drama revolving around the Channel Islands of California—specifically Anacapa Island and Santa Cruz Island—and the controversy surrounding efforts by the National Park Service and its partners to eradicate invasive species and revitalize the islands' natural communities.

== Synopsis ==
In the novel, Dave Lajoy is an impassioned activist for animal rights. He leads an attempt to prevent Alma Boyd Takesue—a biologist and spokesperson for the National Park Service—from removing rats and pigs from the islands.

The novel also flashes back to events on the islands during the 1940s and 1970s.

== Historical basis ==
The novel was inspired by real events. Native wildlife populations on the islands, both part of Channel Islands National Park, had been pushed toward extinction by a variety of invasive species, including the golden eagle, black rats, and feral pigs and sheep. In 2001 and 2002 the National Park Service used poison to eradicate Anacapa Island's non-native black rats, and then partnered with other government agencies and the Nature Conservancy to remove feral pigs from Santa Cruz Island—-an operation the agencies completed in 2006.
