= World's End (Boyle novel) =

Novel by T. Coraghessan Boyle

- 1st US edition cover
- Author: T. C. Boyle
- Language: English
- Publisher: Viking Press
- Publication date: October 8, 1987
- Publication place: United States
- Media type: Print (hardback & paperback)
- Pages: 456 pp (first edition, hardcover)
- ISBN: 0-670-81489-X (first edition, hardcover)
- OCLC: 15366191
- Dewey Decimal: 813/.54 19
- LC Class: PS3552.O932 W67 1987

World's End is a 1987 historical fiction novel by T. C. Boyle. The novel, characterized by dark satire, tells the story of several generations of families in the Hudson River Valley. It was the winner of the 1988 PEN/Faulkner Award for Fiction.

== Summary ==
Haunted by his family’s traitorous legacy and dazed by pot, cheap wine, sex, and a disturbingly real brush with ancestral ghosts, Walter Van Brunt is about to crash headlong into history.

This journey will push him to search for his missing father and carry the story deep into the Hudson River Valley’s past, moving from the 1960s to the anticommunist unrest of the 1940s, and finally to the late seventeenth century, where long-buried secrets of three intertwined families - the noble Van Warts, the Mohonk people, and Walter’s own Van Brunt ancestors - come to light.

== Book information ==
World's End by T. C. Boyle

- Hardcover – ISBN 0-670-81489-X (1987, First edition) published by Viking Press
- Paperback – ISBN 0-14-029993-9 (July 20, 1990) published by Penguin Books

== In popular culture ==
The book was referenced in the popular American sitcom How I Met Your Mother, in the season 5 episode "Girls Vs. Suits".
