= The Road to Wellville =

1993 novel by T. Coraghessan Boyle

- US edition cover
- Author: T. C. Boyle
- Language: English
- Publisher: Viking Press
- Publication date: May 1, 1993
- Publication place: United States
- Media type: Print (hardback & paperback)
- Pages: 496 p.
- ISBN: 0-670-84334-2
- OCLC: 26856894
- Website: tcboyle.com/books/book_8.html

The Road to Wellville is a 1993 novel by American author T. C. Boyle. Set in Battle Creek, Michigan, during the early days of breakfast cereals, the story includes a historical fictionalization of John Harvey Kellogg, the inventor of corn flakes.

The title comes from an actual booklet called "The Road to Wellville" written by C. W. Post, a former patient at the sanitarium who was inspired by his diet there to found his own cereal business and become a major competitor to the Kelloggs. Post used to give out his booklet in boxes of Grape-Nuts cereal. In the novel, the character Will Lightbody brings up this phrase and incurs Kellogg's wrath.

The Road to Wellville was adapted into a movie in 1994, directed by Alan Parker and starring Anthony Hopkins (as John Harvey Kellogg), Bridget Fonda, Matthew Broderick, John Cusack, Michael Lerner, Dana Carvey (as George Kellogg), Lara Flynn Boyle, John Neville, Colm Meaney, Camryn Manheim, and Monica Parker. The northeast US scenes were primarily filmed at Mohonk Mountain House, an historic stick-frame hotel in New Paltz, New York.

== Plot ==
The book's plot details three narratives which take place between November 1907 and late May 1908 in John Harvey Kellogg's Battle Creek, Michigan sanitarium. The first thread concerns Will and Eleanor Lightbody. Eleanor, a fan of Dr. Kellogg, drags Will to Kellogg's sanitarium. Will has recently suffered stomach pains and is still recovering from bouts of alcohol and drug addiction—the latter at the hands of his wife. Eleanor suffered a brutal miscarriage, which has left her physically weak. Hoping to improve his marriage, Will goes along but is constantly filled with doubts about Kellogg's health methods. While he takes part in the therapy, he gags at health food, does not enjoy the laughing therapy, and watches as his friend Homer Praetz is electrocuted during a sinusoidal bath. Meanwhile, his wife Eleanor finds too much enjoyment at the sanitarium, especially at the hands of Dr. Spitzvogel, a doctor who practices Die Handhabung Therapeutik—or in common parlance, erotic massage.

Charlie Ossining, a peripatetic merchant, attempts to market a new type of cereal, Per-Fo, with a partner Bender, whose slick and untrustworthy behavior disarms him. They join forces with George Kellogg, adopted son of John Harvey Kellogg, who has had a falling out with his father and seeks revenge. George agrees to use his name on Per-Fo in the hopes the cereal will be bought out by the Kellogg's Company.

John Harvey Kellogg, a doctor fond of health food and what would now be called alternative medicine, inserts himself into the life of each character, whether as health guru to Eleanor, competitor to Charlie and Bender, or torturer of Will. His attempts at untested health cures, such as radium treatments, are comically tragic. As the sanitarium unravels, and son George becomes increasingly angry, father and "master of all" John must assert his control and keep his institution afloat.

== Book information ==
The Road to Wellville by T. C. Boyle

- Hardcover - ISBN 0-670-84334-2 (first edition) published by Viking Press
- Paperback - ISBN 0-14-016718-8 published by Penguin Books
