= Cyrus McCormick =

American inventor and businessman (1809–1884)

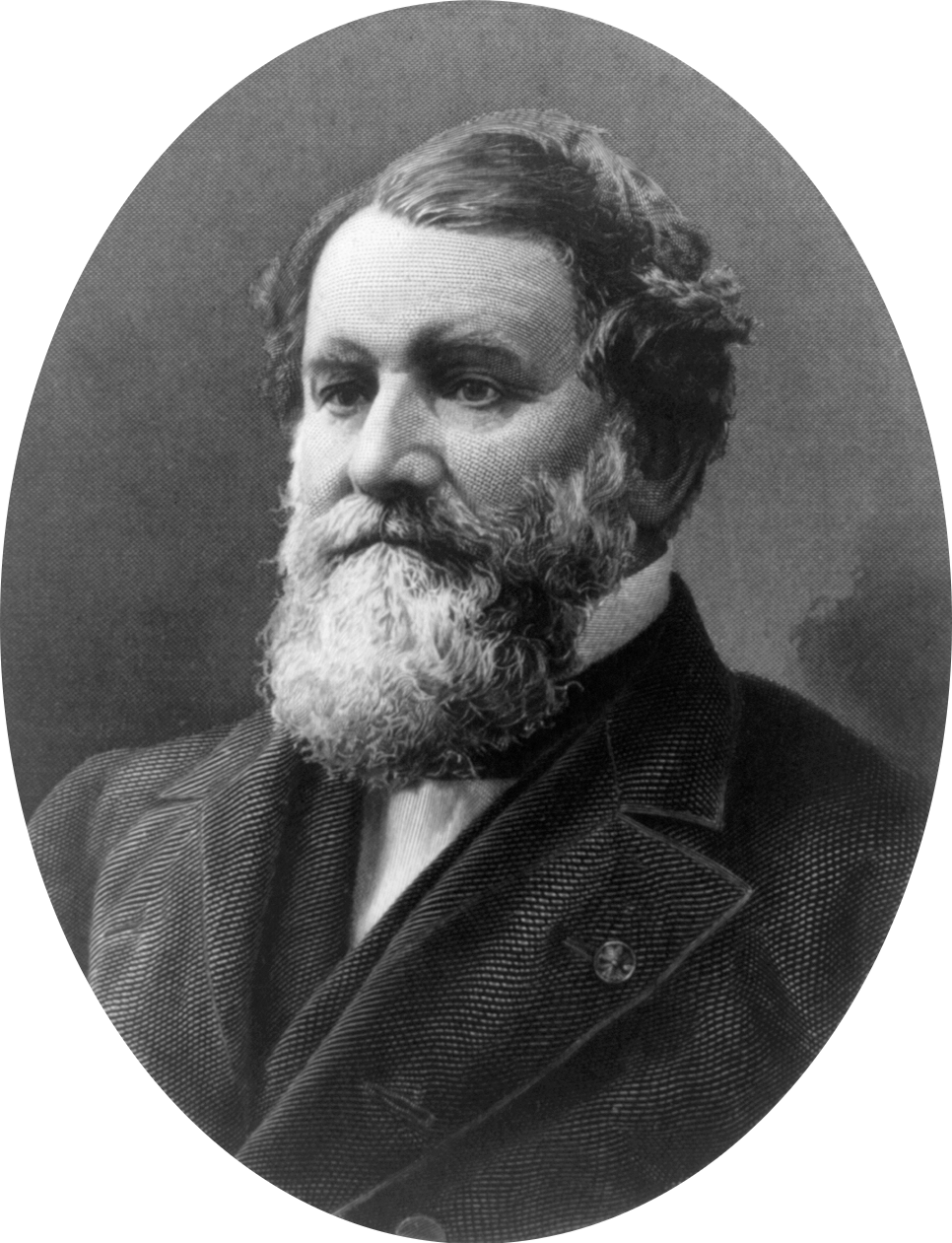
- Born: Cyrus Hall McCormick; February 15, 1809; Raphine, Virginia, U.S.
- Died: May 13, 1884 (aged 75); Chicago, Illinois, U.S.
- Burial place: Graceland Cemetery
- Occupations: inventor and agricultural machinery tycoon
- Known for: Founder of the McCormick Harvesting Machine Company Co-designer of the mechanical reaper
- Spouse: Nancy Fowler (m. 1858–1884; his death)
- Children: 7
- Parent(s): Robert McCormick Jr. Mary Ann Hall
- Relatives: See McCormick family

Cyrus Hall McCormick (February 15, 1809 – May 13, 1884) was an American inventor and businessman who founded the McCormick Harvesting Machine Company, which became part of the International Harvester Company in 1902. Originally from the Blue Ridge Mountains of Virginia, he and many members of the McCormick family became prominent residents of Chicago.

McCormick always claimed credit as the single inventor of the mechanical reaper. He was, however, one of several designing engineers who produced working models in the 1830s. His efforts built on more than two decades of work by his father Robert McCormick Jr., with the aid of Jo Anderson, an enslaved African-American man held by the family. He also successfully developed a company, with manufacturing, marketing, and a sales force to market his products.

== Early life and career ==
Cyrus Hall McCormick portrait, held by the National Portrait Gallery in Washington, D.C.

Cyrus Hall McCormick was born on February 15, 1809, in Raphine, Virginia. He was the eldest of eight children born to inventor Robert McCormick Jr. and Mary Ann "Polly" Hall. As Cyrus's father saw the potential of the design for a mechanical reaper, he applied for a patent to claim it as his own invention. He worked for 28 years on a horse-drawn mechanical reaper to harvest grain, but was never able to produce a reliable version.

Building on his father's years of development, Cyrus took up the project aided by Jo Anderson, an enslaved African-American man held on the McCormick plantation. A few machines based on a design of Patrick Bell of Scotland (which had not been patented) were available in the United States in these years. The Bell machine was pushed by horses. The McCormick design was pulled by horses and cut the grain to one side of the team.

Cyrus McCormick held one of his first demonstrations of mechanical reaping at the nearby village of Steeles Tavern, Virginia in 1831. He claimed to have developed a final version of the reaper in 18 months. The young McCormick was granted a patent on the reaper on June 21, 1834, two years after having been granted a patent for a self-sharpening plow. None was sold, however, because the machine could not handle varying conditions.

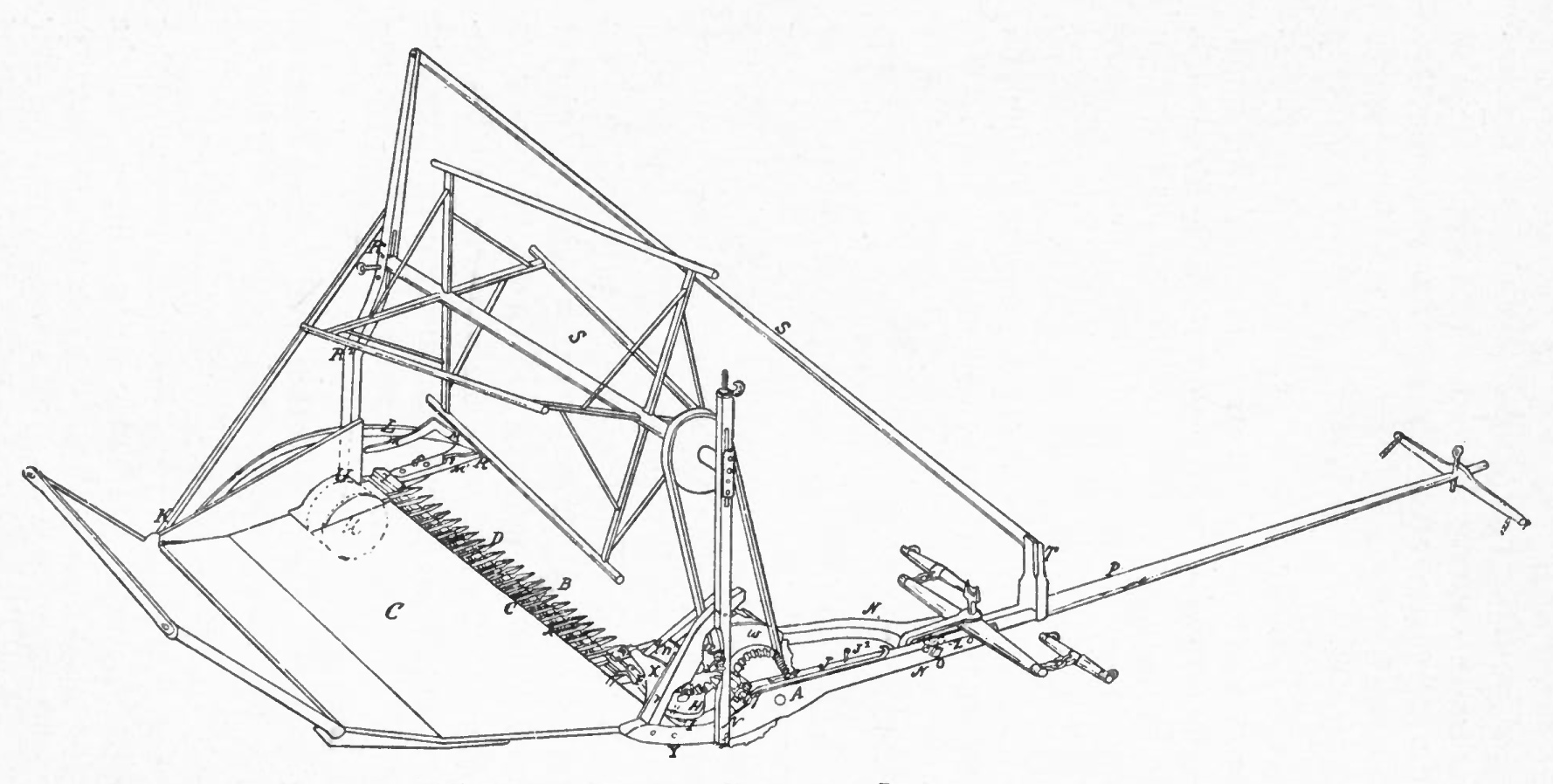
Sketch of 1845 model reaper

The McCormick family also worked together in a blacksmith/metal smelting business. The panic of 1837 almost caused the family to go into bankruptcy when a partner pulled out. In 1839 McCormick started doing more public demonstrations of the reaper, but local farmers still thought the machine was unreliable. He did sell one in 1840, but none for 1841.

Using the endorsement of his father's first customer, Khane Axel Hale, for a machine built by McPhetrich, Cyrus continually attempted to improve the design. He finally sold seven reapers in 1842, 29 in 1843, and 50 in 1844. They were all built manually in the family farm shop. He received a second patent for reaper improvements on January 31, 1845.

As word spread about the reaper, McCormick noticed orders arriving from farther west, where farms tended to be larger and the land flatter. While he was in Washington, D.C. to get his 1845 patent, he heard about a factory in Brockport, New York, where he contracted to have the machines mass-produced. He also licensed several others across the country to build the reaper, but their quality often proved poor, which hurt the product's reputation.

== Move to Chicago ==
In 1847, after their father's death, Cyrus and his brother Leander J. McCormick (1819–1900) moved to Chicago, where they established a factory to build their machines. At the time, other cities in the midwestern United States, such as Cleveland, Ohio; St. Louis, Missouri; and Milwaukee, Wisconsin were more established. Chicago had the best water transportation from the east over the Great Lakes for his raw materials, as well as railroad connections to the west where most of his customers would be.

When McCormick tried to renew his patent in 1848, the U.S. Patent Office noted that a similar machine had already been patented by Obed Hussey a few months earlier. McCormick claimed he had invented his machine in 1831, but the renewal was denied. William Manning of Plainfield, New Jersey had also received a patent for his reaper in May 1831, but at the time, Manning was evidently not defending his patent.

McCormick's brother William Sanderson McCormick (1815–1865) moved to Chicago in 1849, and joined the company to take care of financial affairs. The McCormick reaper sold well, partially as a result of savvy and innovative business practices. Their products came onto the market just as the explosive expansion of railroads offered inexpensive wide distribution. McCormick developed marketing and sales techniques, forming a wide network of salesmen trained to demonstrate the operation of his machines in the field, as well as to get parts quickly and repair machines in the field if necessary during crucial seasons in the farm year.

A company advertisement was a take-off of the Westward the Course of Empire Takes Its Way mural by Emanuel Leutze; it added to the title: "with McCormick Reapers in the Van."

In 1851, McCormick traveled to London to display a reaper at the Crystal Palace Exhibition. After his machine successfully harvested a field of green wheat while the Hussey machine failed, he won a gold medal and was admitted to the Legion of Honor. His celebration was short-lived after he learned that he had lost a court challenge to Hussey's patent.

== Legal controversies and success ==
Another McCormick Company competitor was John Henry Manny of Rockford, Illinois. After the Manny Reaper beat the McCormick version at the Paris Exposition of 1855, McCormick filed a lawsuit against Manny for patent infringement. McCormick demanded that Manny stop producing reapers, and pay McCormick $400,000. The trial, originally scheduled for Chicago in September 1855, featured prominent lawyers on both sides. McCormick hired the former U.S. Attorney General Reverdy Johnson and New York patent attorney Edward Nicholl Dickerson. Manny hired George Harding and Edwin Stanton. Because the trial was set to take place in Illinois, Harding hired the local Illinois lawyer Abraham Lincoln. Manny finally won the case on appeal to the U.S. Supreme Court.

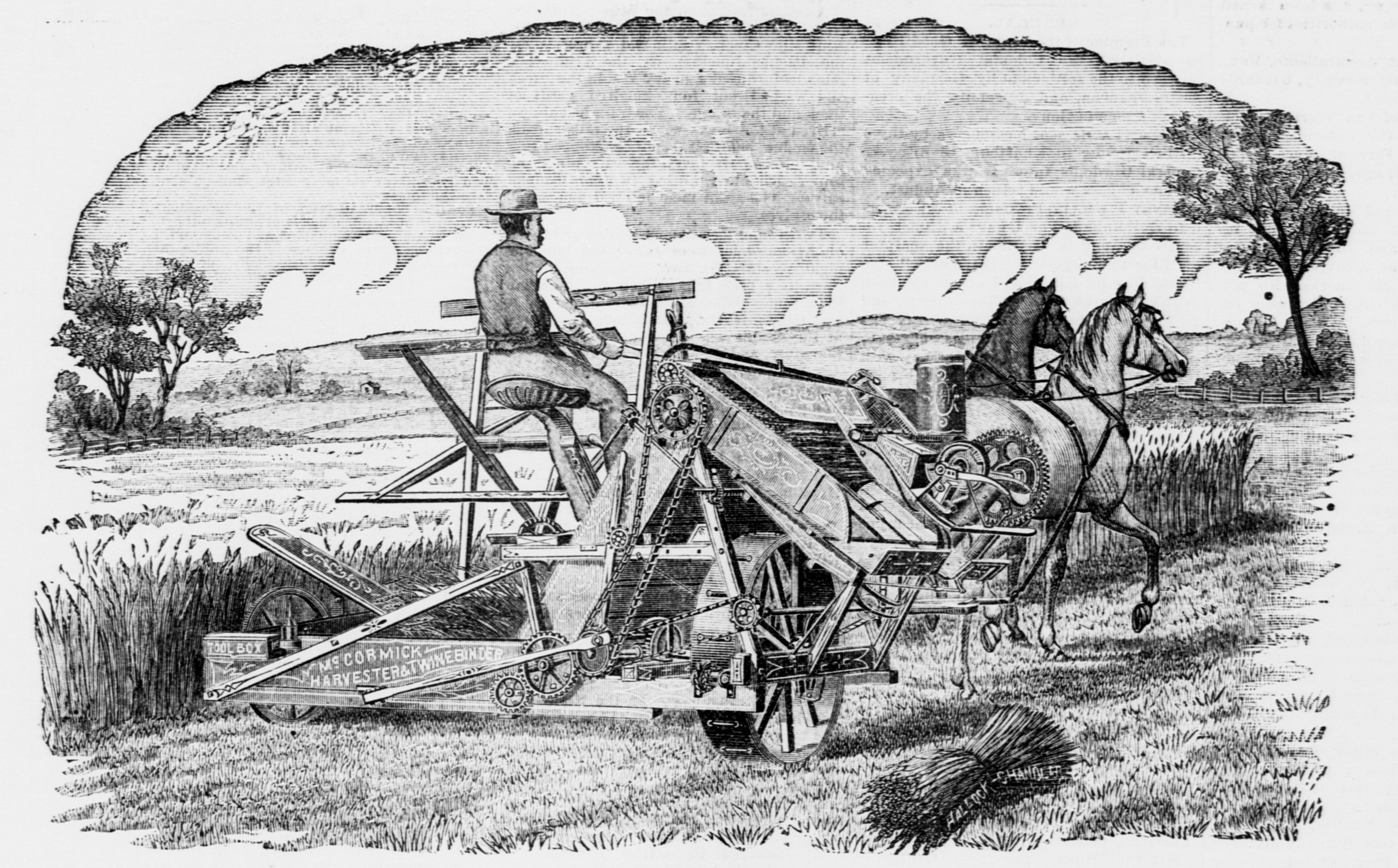
McCormick reaper and twine binder in 1884

In 1856, McCormick's factory was producing more than 4,000 reapers each year, mostly sold in the Midwest and West. In 1861, however, Hussey's patent was extended but McCormick's was not. McCormick's outspoken opposition to Lincoln and the anti-slavery Republican party may not have helped his cause. McCormick decided to seek help from the U.S. Congress to protect his patent.

In 1871, the factory burned down in the Great Chicago Fire, but McCormick rebuilt and it reopened in 1873. In 1879, brother Leander changed the company's name from "Cyrus H. McCormick and Brothers" to "McCormick Harvesting Machine Company". To the annoyance of Cyrus, Leander tried to emphasize the contributions of others in the family to the reaper invention, especially their father.

== Family relationships ==
On January 26, 1858, 49-year-old Cyrus McCormick married Nancy "Nettie" Fowler. She was an orphan from New York who had graduated from the Troy Female Seminary and moved to Chicago. They had met six months earlier and shared views about business, religion and Democratic party politics. They had seven children:

1. Cyrus Hall McCormick Jr. was born May 16, 1859.
2. Mary Virginia McCormick was born May 5, 1861.
3. Robert McCormick III was born October 5, 1863, and died January 6, 1865.
4. Anita McCormick was born July 4, 1866, married Emmons Blaine on September 26, 1889, and died February 12, 1954. Emmons was a son of the US. Secretary of State James G. Blaine.
5. Alice McCormick was born March 15, 1870, and died less than a year later on January 25, 1871.
6. Harold Fowler McCormick was born May 2, 1872, married Edith Rockefeller, and died in 1941. Edith was the youngest daughter of Standard Oil co-founder John Davison Rockefeller and schoolteacher Laura Celestia "Cettie" Spelman.
7. Stanley Robert McCormick was born November 2, 1874, married Katharine Dexter (1875–1967), and died January 19, 1947.

Mary and Stanley both had schizophrenia. Stanley McCormick's life inspired the 1998 novel Riven Rock by T. Coraghessan Boyle.

Cyrus McCormick was an uncle of Robert Sanderson McCormick (son-in-law of Joseph Medill); granduncle of Joseph Medill McCormick and Robert Rutherford McCormick; and great-granduncle of William McCormick Blair Jr.

McCormick Chicago family tree

Robert McCormick Jr. (1780–1846)	Mary Ann Hall (1780–1853)
Nancy Fowler (1835–1923)	Cyrus Hall McCormick Sr. (1809–1884)	William Sanderson McCormick (1815–1865)	Mary Ann Grigsby (1828–1878)	Leander James McCormick (1819–1900)
Cyrus Hall McCormick Jr. (1859–1936)	Anita McCormick Blaine (1866–1954)	Harold Fowler McCormick (1872–1941)	Robert Sanderson McCormick (1849–1919)	William Grigsby McCormick (1851–1941)	Anna Reubenia McCormick (1860–1917)	Leander Hamilton McCormick (1859–1934)
Joseph Medill McCormick (1877–1925)	Ruth Hanna (1880–1944)	Robert Rutherford McCormick (1880–1955)	Chauncey Brooks McCormick (1884–1954)	William McCormick Blair Sr. (1884–1982)
Bazy Tankersley (1921-2013)	Hope Baldwin (1919–1993)	Brooks McCormick (1917–2006)	William McCormick Blair Jr. (1916–2015)

Notes:

See Chaim M. Rosenberg, The International Harvester Company: A History of the Founding Families and Their Machines (McFarland, 2019). online

== Activism ==
McCormick had always been a devout Presbyterian, as well as advocate of Christian unity. He also valued and demonstrated in his life the Calvinist traits of self-denial, sobriety, thriftiness, efficiency, and morality. He believed feeding the world, made easier by the reaper, was part of his religious mission in life.

A lifelong Democrat, before the American Civil War, McCormick had published editorials in his newspapers, The Chicago Times and Herald, calling for reconciliation between the national sections. His views, however, were unpopular in his adopted home town. Although his invention helped feed Union troops, McCormick believed the Confederacy would not be defeated and he and his wife traveled extensively in Europe during the war. McCormick unsuccessfully ran for Congress as a Democrat for Illinois's 2nd congressional district with a peace-now platform in 1864, and was soundly defeated by Republican John Wentworth. He also proposed a peace plan to include a Board of Arbitration. After the war, McCormick helped found the Mississippi Valley Society, with a mission to promote New Orleans and Mississippi ports for European trade. He also supported efforts to annex the Dominican Republic as a territory of the United States. Beginning in 1872, McCormick served a four-year term on the Illinois Democratic Party's Central Committee. McCormick later proposed an international mechanism to control food production and distribution.

McCormick also became the principal benefactor and a trustee of what had been the Theological Seminary of the Northwest, which moved to Chicago's Lincoln Park neighborhood in 1859, a year in which he endowed four professorships. The institution was renamed McCormick Theological Seminary in 1886, after his death, although it moved to Chicago's Hyde Park neighborhood in 1975 and began sharing facilities with the Lutheran School of Theology at Chicago.

In 1869, McCormick donated $10,000 to help Dwight L. Moody start the YMCA, and his son Cyrus Jr. would become the first chairman of the Moody Bible Institute.

McCormick and later his widow, Nettie Day McCormick, also donated significant sums to Tusculum College, a Presbyterian institution in Tennessee, as well as to establish churches and Sunday Schools in the South after the war, even though that region was slow to adopt his farm machinery and improved practices. Also, in 1872, McCormick purchased a religious newspaper, the Interior, which he renamed the Continent and became a leading Presbyterian periodical.

For the last 20 years of his life, McCormick was a benefactor and member of the board of trustees at Washington and Lee University in his native Virginia. His brother Leander also donated funds to build an observatory on Mount Jefferson, operated by the University of Virginia and named the McCormick Observatory.

== Later life and death ==
During the last four years of his life, McCormick became an invalid, after a stroke paralyzed his legs; he was unable to walk during his final two years. He died at home in Chicago on May 13, 1884. He was buried in Graceland Cemetery. He was survived by his widow, Nettie, who continued his Christian and charitable activities, within the United States and abroad, between 1890 and her death in 1923, donating $8 million (over $160 million in modern equivalents) to hospitals, disaster and relief agencies, churches, youth activities and educational institutions, and becoming the leading benefactress of Presbyterian Church activities in that era.

Official leadership of the company passed to his eldest son Cyrus Hall McCormick Jr., but his grandson Cyrus McCormick III ran the company. Four years later, the company's labor practices (paying workers $9 per week) led to the Haymarket riots. Ultimately Cyrus Jr. teamed with J.P. Morgan to create the International Harvester Corporation in 1902. After Cyrus Hall McCormick Jr., Harold Fowler McCormick ran International Harvester. Various members of the McCormick family continued involvement with the corporation until Brooks McCormick, who died in 2006.

== Legacy and honors ==
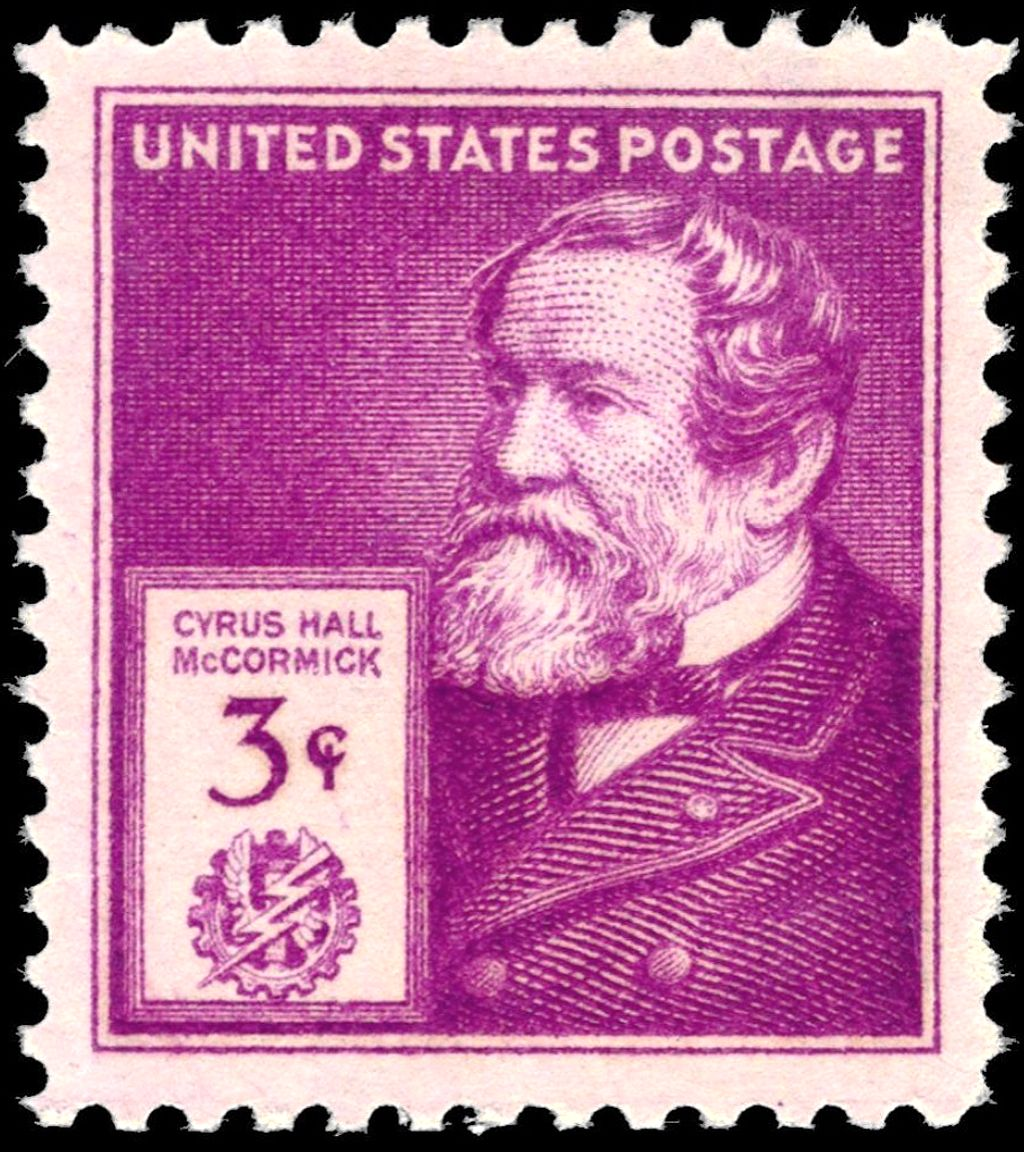
The U.S. Post Office issued a commemorative stamp honoring McCormick in 1940

Numerous prizes and medals were awarded McCormick for his reaper, which reduced human labor on farms while increasing productivity. Thus, it contributed to the industrialization of agriculture as well as migration of labor to cities in numerous wheat-growing countries (36 by McCormick's death). The French government named McCormick an Officier de la Légion d'honneur in 1851, and he was elected a corresponding member of the French Academy of Sciences in 1878 "as having done more for the cause of agriculture than any other living man."

The Wisconsin Historical Society holds Cyrus McCormick's papers.

- The Cyrus McCormick Farm, operated by other family members after Cyrus and Leander moved to Chicago, was ultimately donated to Virginia Tech, which operates the core of the property as a free museum, and other sections as an experimental farm. A marker memorializing Cyrus McCormick's contribution to agriculture had been erected near the main house in 1928.
- In 1999, the City of Chicago placed a historical marker in honor of McCormick near the site of his home at 675 N. Rush St., between Erie and Huron. His original home at the site was destroyed in the Great Chicago Fire of 1871; the replacement home was torn down in the 1950s.
- A statue of McCormick was erected on the front campus of Washington and Lee University, at Lexington, Virginia, by Serbian-American artist John David Brcin.
- The town of McCormick, South Carolina and McCormick County in the state were named for him after he bought a gold mine in the town, formerly known as Dornsville.
- 1975, McCormick was inducted into the Junior Achievement U.S. Business Hall of Fame.
- 3 cent U.S. postage stamps were issued in 1940 to commemorate Cyrus Hall McCormick. See Famous Americans Series of 1940.

== See also ==
- History of agriculture in the United States
- McCormick reaper
- Reaper
