= Katharine McCormick =

American suffragist and philanthropist

Katharine Dexter McCormick
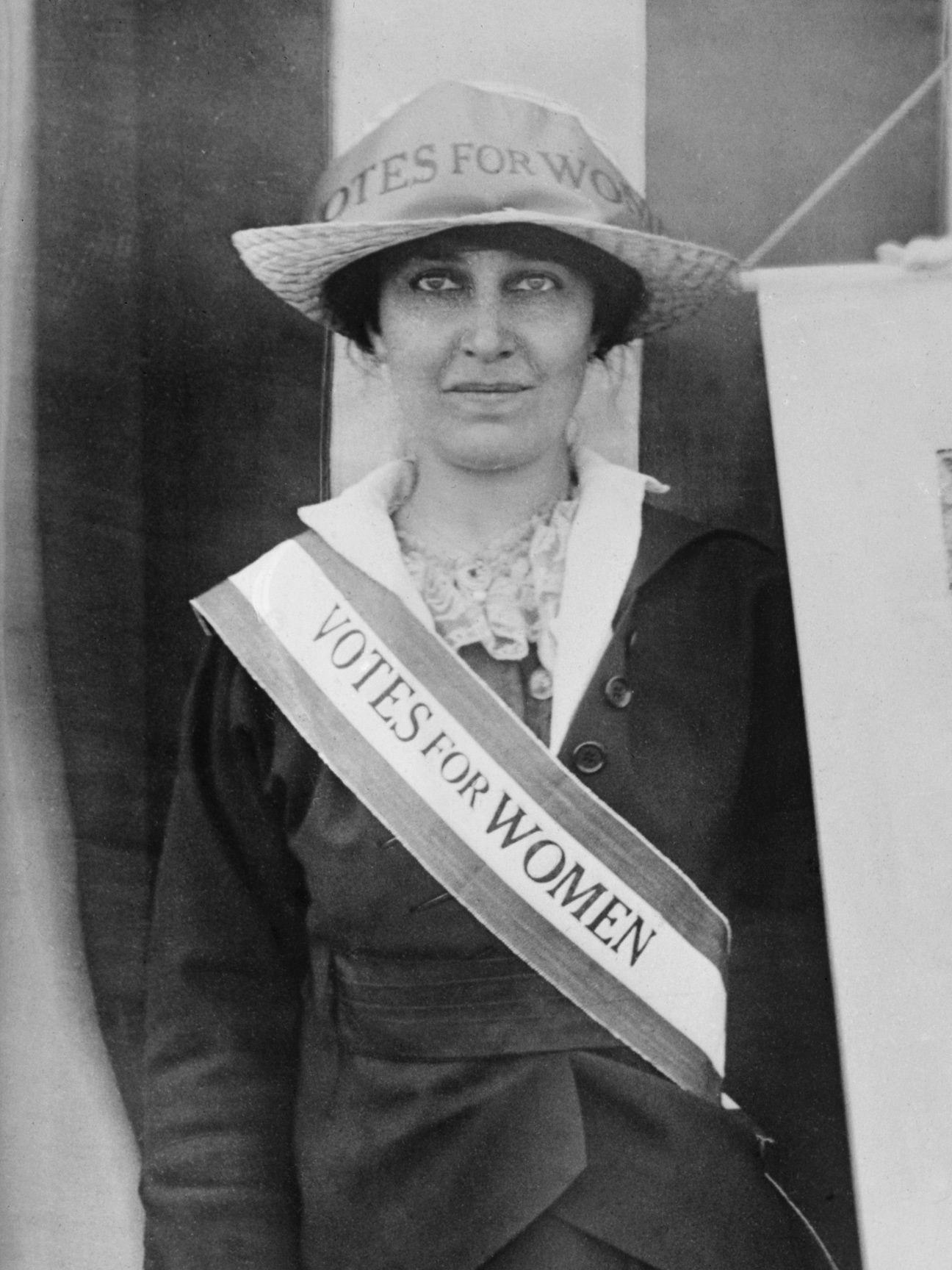
- McCormick on April 22, 1913
- Born: Katharine Moore Dexter; August 27, 1875; Dexter, Michigan
- Died: December 28, 1967 (aged 92); Boston, Massachusetts
- Burial place: Graceland Cemetery
- Education: Massachusetts Institute of Technology

Katharine Dexter McCormick (August 27, 1875 – December 28, 1967) was an American suffragist, philanthropist and, after her husband's death, heir to a substantial part of the McCormick family fortune. She funded most of the research necessary to develop the first birth control pill.

== Early life and education ==
Katharine Dexter was born on August 27, 1875, in Dexter, Michigan, in her grandparents' mansion, Gordon Hall. Her grandfather, the judge Samuel W. Dexter, son of politician Samuel Dexter, had settled and founded the town in 1824. She grew up in Chicago where her father, Wirt Dexter, was a prominent lawyer and philanthropic leader. Following the early death of her father of a heart attack at age 57 when she was 14 years old, she and her mother Josephine moved to Boston in 1890. Four years later, her brother Samuel died of meningitis at age 25.

Dexter passed entrance exams to the Massachusetts Institute of Technology in 1896, but was required to take three years of prerequisite classes to enroll. Arriving in 1899, Katharine graduated in 1904, earning a BSc in biology.

== Marriage to Stanley McCormick ==
She planned to attend medical school, but instead married Stanley Robert McCormick, the youngest son of Cyrus McCormick and heir to the International Harvester fortune, on September 15, 1904. In September 1905, they moved into a house in Brookline, Massachusetts. The couple did not have any children.

Stanley graduated cum laude from Princeton University in 1895 where he had also been a gifted athlete on the varsity tennis team. He had been showing signs of progressively worsening mental illness. In September 1906, he was hospitalized for over a year at McLean Hospital and was originally diagnosed with dementia praecox, an early label for what is now today known as schizophrenia. Katharine then lived with her mother in Boston, where the two became suffragists. Josephine had been supportive of Katharine's pursuit of higher education and marched in Boston's first suffrage parade.

In June 1908, Stanley was moved to the McCormicks' Riven Rock estate in Montecito, California, where his schizophrenic older sister, Mary Virginia, had lived from 1898 to 1904 before being placed in a Huntsville, Alabama, sanitarium. While there, he was examined by the prominent German psychiatrist Emil Kraepelin and diagnosed with the catatonic form of dementia praecox. In 1909, Stanley was declared legally incompetent and his guardianship divided between Katharine and the McCormick family.

== Women's rights activist ==
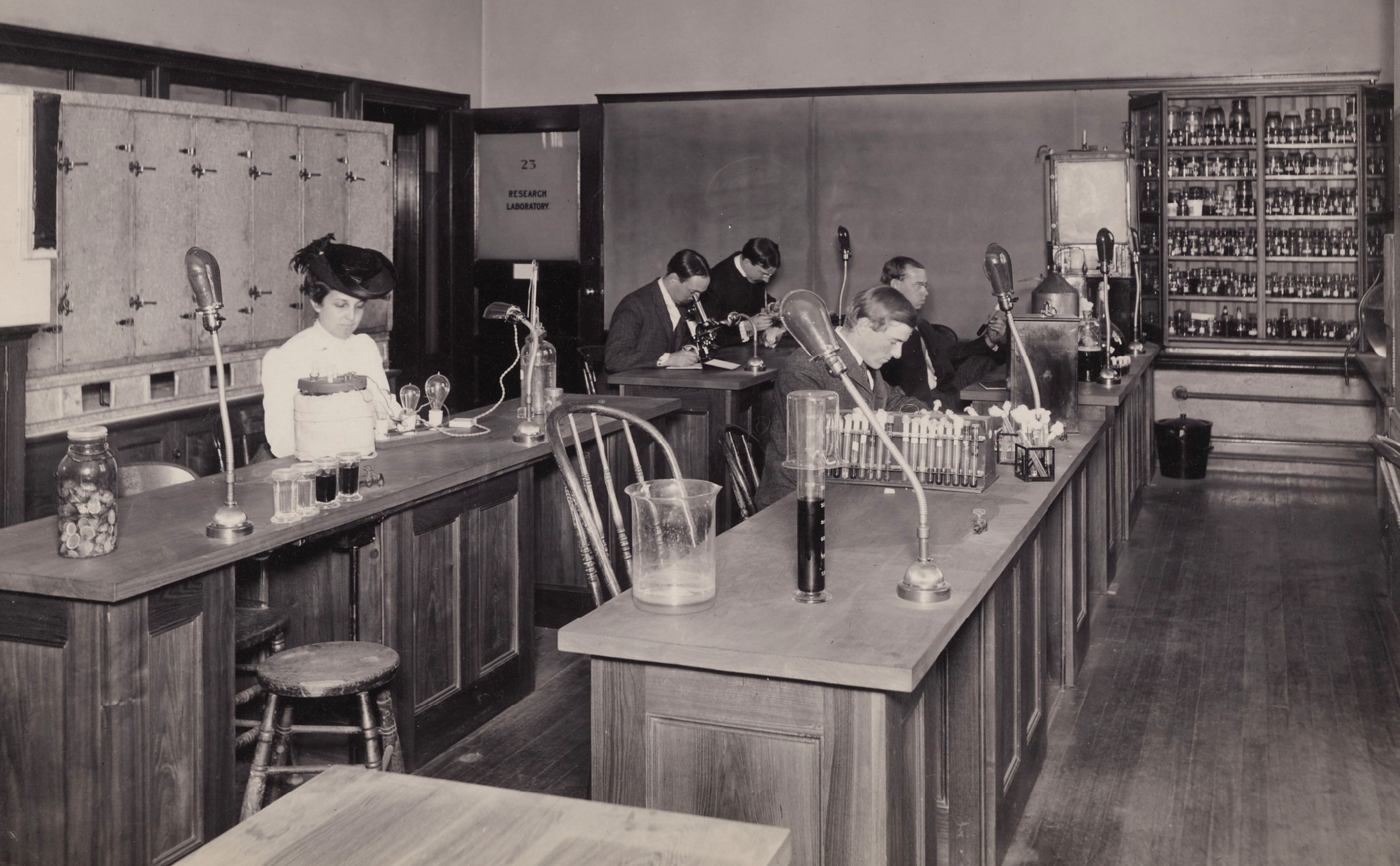
McCormick donned a hat in MIT's chemistry lab.

Katharine's plea for gender equality was apparent from early on. As an undergraduate at MIT, she confronted administration officials. MIT required that women wear hats at all times, including while at work. Katharine initially complied, then later refused. She argued that it was a fire hazard for feathered hats to be worn in laboratories. As a result, MIT's administration changed their policies.

McCormick argued that suffrage was necessary for guaranteeing women's political freedom, and that women deserved political equality because their abilities were equal to men's. She felt that the suffrage movement itself provided a valuable opportunity for service from women. These views of women's right to political equality were aligned with other wealthy suffragists of the time.

In 1909 McCormick spoke at the first outdoor rally for woman suffrage in Massachusetts. She became vice president and treasurer of the National American Woman Suffrage Association (NAWSA) and funded the association's publication the Woman's Journal. Because her donations arose from Stanley's estate, she needed court permission to make donations while he was alive. McCormick paid $6,000 to cancel debts from the Woman's Journal and engineered its controversial split from NAWSA. She provided NAWSA annual donations of one or two thousand in following years, with Dexter matching these. McCormick began replacing Alva Belmont as one of NAWSA's most substantial benefactors, diminishing Belmont's influence over the organization. In 1913, McCormick and Dexter helped organize the Bay State Suffrage Festival. McCormick helped push Alice Paul's Congressional Union out of NAWSA after accusing them of fundraising without McCormick's proper oversight. McCormick and NAWSA leader Carrie Chapman Catt disagreed with Paul's militant political activism, which was inspired by the English suffragettes, and McCormick was also concerned by the CU's growing share of what she saw as limited donor funds.

McCormick organized much of Catt's efforts to gain ratification for the Nineteenth Amendment. She backed Catt's plan for suffragists to display loyalty during World War I as an effort to earn Woodrow Wilson's support for their cause. While working with Catt, she met other social activists, including Mary Dennett and Margaret Sanger. Katharine met Sanger in 1917, and later that year joined the Committee of 100, a group of women promoting the legalization of birth control. During World War I, Katharine also worked as a chairwoman of the association's War Service Department. In addition, she was a member of the Women's Committee of the Council of National Defense. In 1920, after the Nineteenth Amendment was ratified, McCormick became the vice president of the League of Women Voters.

Throughout the 1920s, McCormick worked with Sanger on birth control issues. McCormick smuggled more than 1,000 diaphragms from Europe to New York City to Sanger's Clinical Research Bureau. She scheduled meetings with major European diaphragm manufacturers in cities such as Rome and Paris, and used her language skills and biology background to pose as a French or German scientist and place large orders for the devices. They were shipped to her family chateau, Prangins Castle, outside Geneva, where they were sewn into the linings of fashionable coats and other garments. She smuggled them past U.S. customs agents in New York, having successfully disguised them as the spoils of extravagant European shopping sprees for high-end fashions. She made these trips every summer from 1922 to 1925, retiring only after the 1925 Santa Barbara earthquake forced her to redirect her attention to rebuilding her husband's estate and devote her energy to helping direct his care.

In 1927, McCormick hosted a reception of delegates attending the 1927 World Population Conference at her home in Geneva. In that year McCormick also turned to the science of endocrinology to aid her husband, believing that a defective adrenal gland caused his schizophrenia.

== Philanthropist ==
Inspired by her husband's diagnosis, Katharine was determined to find a cure. Believing that Stanley's illness was a defective adrenal gland, and could be treated with hormone treatment, she established the Neuroendocrine Research Foundation from 1927 to 1947 at Harvard Medical School, and subsidized the publication of the journal Endocrinology. Originally called the "Stanley R. McCormick Memorial Foundation for Neuro- Endocrine Research Corporation", it was the first U.S institute to launch research on the link between endocrinology and mental illness. She also created a research center for the care of the mentally ill at Worcester State Hospital. Her mother Josephine died on November 16, 1937, at age 91 leaving her an estate of more than $10 million (equivalent to $220 million in 2025). Stanley died on January 19, 1947, at age 72 leaving an estate of over $35 million (equivalent to $500 million in 2025) to Katharine. She spent five years settling his estate, 85% of which went to pay inheritance taxes.

In 1953 McCormick met Gregory Goodwin Pincus through Margaret Sanger. Pincus had been working on developing a hormonal birth control method since 1951 at his own research laboratory, the Worcester Foundation for Experimental Biology. The drug company that supported Pincus stopped funding his pioneering research because he had yet to make a profit. As a result, McCormick started to fund Pincus's research foundation. The donations started at $100,000 annually, and later $150,000-$180,000 up until her death in 1967. In sum, McCormick had provided $2 million (equivalent to $19 million in 2025) of her own money for the development of the oral contraceptive pill. The Food and Drug Administration (FDA) approved the sale of the Pill in 1957 for menstrual disorders and added contraception to its indications in 1960. Even after the pill was approved, she continued to fund Pincus's lab and research on ways into improving birth control research through the 1960s.

After the successful development and approval of the contraceptive pill, Katharine directed her attention to the lack of housing for women at MIT. MIT was always coeducational, but because it could provide housing to only some fifty female students, many of the women who attended MIT had to be local residents. However, the place of women at the Institute was far from secure as Katharine Dexter told Dorothy Weeks (a physicist and mathematician who earned her master's and doctorate from MIT) that she had lived "in a cold fear that suddenly—unexpectedly—Tech might exclude women..."

In order to provide female students a permanent place at MIT, she donated the money to found Stanley McCormick Hall, an all female dormitory that would allow MIT to house 200 female students. Katharine's funding made a tremendous impact on the number of women at MIT, increasing the number from 3% to 40%. The ramifications of the hall are best stated by William Hecht '61, executive vice president of the Association of Alumni and Alumnae of MIT when he said, "the visible presence of women at MIT helped open up the science and engineering professions to a large part of the population that before had been excluded. It demonstrated beyond a shadow of a doubt that at MIT men and women are equal."

McCormick was also an avid supporter of the arts, particularly to the Santa Barbara Museum of Art where she was one of the Museum's founding members, vice president and donor of the Stanley McCormick Gallery in 1942. Sharing vice president duties with fellow philanthropist and art collector Wright S. Ludington, McCormick served on the Museum's Buildings Committee and was responsible for the hiring of the renowned Chicago architect, David Adler, to convert the old post office into the art museum.

== Death ==
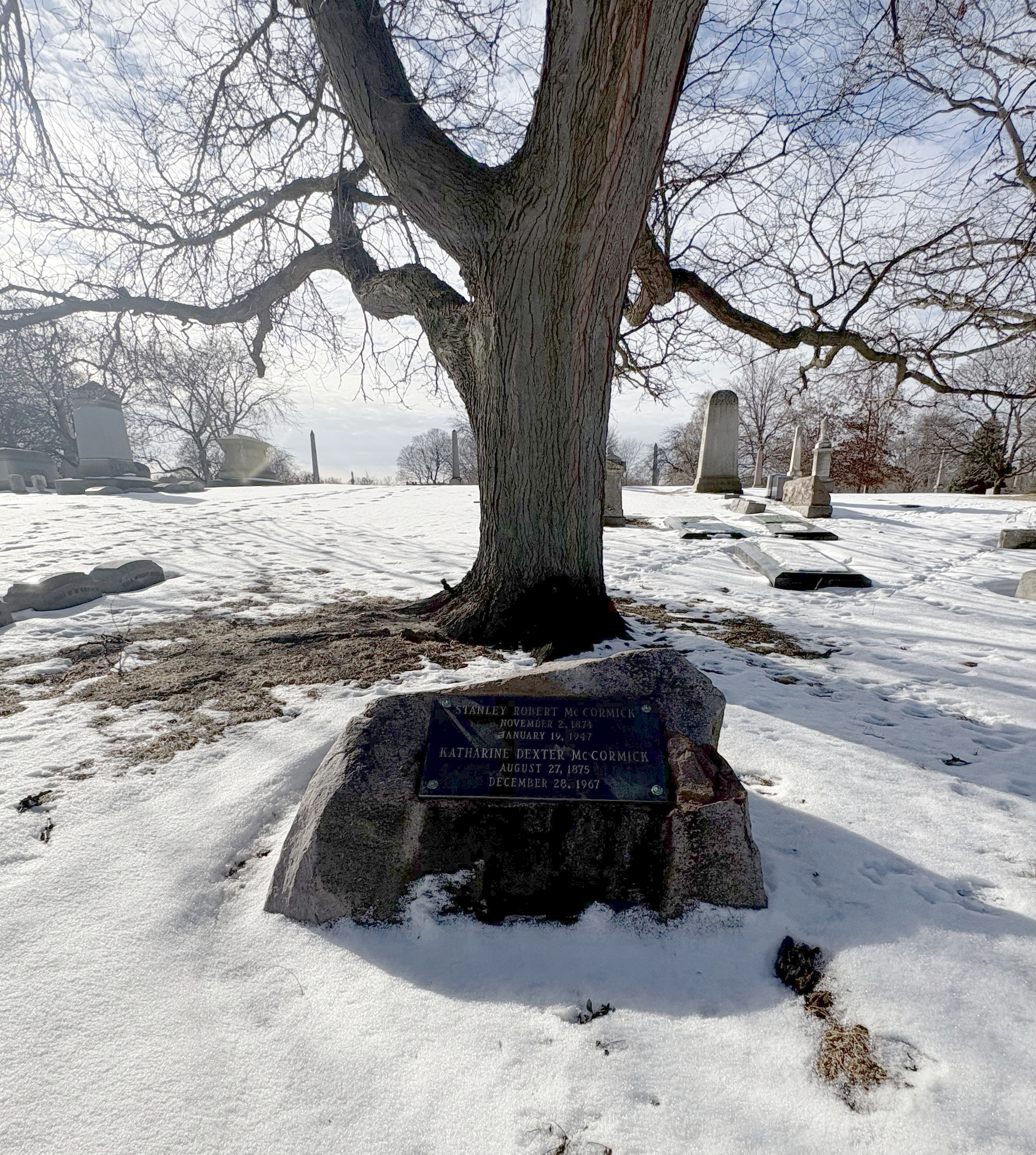
McCormick's grave at Graceland Cemetery

She died on December 28, 1967, in Boston, Massachusetts, aged 92, and was buried at Graceland Cemetery in Chicago. Her will provided $5 million (equivalent to $48 million in 2025) to the Stanford University School of Medicine to support female physicians, $5 million to the Planned Parenthood Federation of America, which funded the Katharine Dexter McCormick Library in Manhattan, New York City, and $1 million to the Worcester Foundation for Experimental Biology. In addition, McCormick made arrangements for $500,000 to be donated to the Art Institute of Chicago and the donation of nine important impressionist paintings to the Santa Barbara Museum of Art, which included three major landscapes by Claude Monet. Along with these paintings, McCormick also donated her residence, which is now known as the Ridley-Tree Education Center. It is currently used by the Museum for child and adult art classes.

== Legacy ==
Katharine McCormick is a character in T.C. Boyle's novel Riven Rock (1998), which is mainly about her husband Stanley's mental illness.

McCormick was inducted into the National Women's Hall of Fame in 1998. She was inducted into the Michigan Women's Hall of Fame in 2000.

There is a dorm named after her husband at the Massachusetts Institute of Technology.

== See also ==
- Birth control movement in the United States
