= Talk Talk (novel) =

2006 novel by T. C. Boyle

- Author: T.C. Boyle
- Language: English
- Publisher: Viking Press
- Publication date: July 6, 2006 (First edition, Hardcover)
- Publication place: United States
- Media type: Print (Hardcover)
- Pages: 352 pages
- ISBN: 0-670-03770-2

Talk Talk is a 2006 novel by T. C. Boyle. It concerns a young deaf woman who becomes the victim of a credit card fraud and identity theft. When the police are unwilling to help, the woman and her boyfriend attempt to track down the criminal themselves.

== Plot summary ==
Dana Halter is an American woman in her early thirties who at the age of four suffered an infection which left her profoundly deaf. Since then, she has been able to master her life astonishingly well: she has acquired an academic degree and teaches at a school for the deaf in San Roque, likely analogous to Santa Barbara, California. Her boyfriend, Bridger Martin, is a "hearie," a man a few years younger than herself who creates special effects for the film industry. Out of love, Martin has gone to great lengths to accommodate her disability. For example, he has taken a course in sign language.

William "Peck" Wilson is an American raised in Peterskill, New York who is angry with society for failing him. Once a promising young restaurateur, he enters into a sour marriage, has a child with his wife, becomes dependent on his father-in-law's money, and is eventually dumped by his wife. Subsequently, his life takes a turn for the worse and he has to serve a short prison sentence. When he is released from jail, he moves to Marin County, California, takes up a criminal career of stealing others' identities and spending these identities' money to furnish his elaborate tastes.

One such stolen identity belongs to Dana Halter, the deaf woman. Peck believes Dana is a man, and now has a driver's license and a credit card in "his" name. He lives together with an attractive Russian gold digger called Natalia and her daughter by a former lover. He has made Natalia believe that he is a physician. Peck and Natalia live a luxurious life at the expense of Dana Halter and others.

After Dana Halter is put in jail on a charge perpetrated by Wilson in her name, she and Bridger Martin are irate. They decide to track down the identity thief, and a cross-country chase ensues that ends in Peterskill, New York.
