= The Harder They Fall =

The Harder They Fall may refer to:

- The Harder They Fall (1956 film), an American boxing film noir directed by Mark Robson starring Humphrey Bogart
- The Harder They Fall (2021 film), an American Western film directed by Jeymes Samuel
- "The Harder They Fall", a song on the 1968 Phil Ochs album Tape From California
- "The Harder They Fall" (Porridge), a 1975 television episode
- "The Harder They Fall" (Magic City), a 2012 television episode

== See also ==
- The dictionary definition of the bigger they are, the harder they fall at Wiktionary
- The Harder They Come (disambiguation)
