= Drop City (novel) =

2003 novel by T. C. Boyle

- US edition cover
- Author: T. C. Boyle
- Language: English
- Publisher: Viking Press
- Publication date: February 24, 2003
- Publication place: United States
- Media type: Print (hardback & paperback)
- Pages: 464
- ISBN: 0-670-03172-0
- OCLC: 49743603
- Dewey Decimal: 813/.54 21
- LC Class: PS3552.O932 D76 2003

Drop City is a 2003 novel by American author T. C. Boyle. The novel, set in various years from the early 1960s to late 1970s, describes the social evolution of a commune based on the real Drop City, Colorado. However, Boyle's fictional group initially live in California and later move to a remote part of Alaska, and the group shares many qualities with the real Sonoma County Morning Star commune. The novel was a finalist for the 2003 National Book Award.

== Book information ==
- Hardcover – ISBN 0-670-03172-0 (First edition, February 24, 2003), published by Viking Press
- Paperback – ISBN 0-14-200380-8 (January 27, 2004), published by Penguin Books
