= The Inner Circle (Boyle novel) =

Novel by T. C. Boyle

- US edition cover
- Author: T. C. Boyle
- Language: English
- Publisher: Viking Press
- Publication date: 9 September 2004
- Publication place: United States
- Media type: Print (hardback & paperback)
- Pages: 418 pp.
- ISBN: 0-670-03344-8
- OCLC: 53972124
- Dewey Decimal: 813/.54 22
- LC Class: PS3552.O932 I56 2004

The Inner Circle is a novel by T. C. Boyle first published in 2004 about the development of sexology in the United States and about Alfred Kinsey's rise to fame during the late 1940s and early 1950s as seen through the eyes of one of his loyal assistants.

This assistant, however, John Milk, is a fictional character rather than a historical person. Boyle makes it unmistakably clear in the "Author’s Note" that The Inner Circle "is a work of fiction, and [that] all characters and situations have been invented, with the exception of the historical figures of Alfred C. Kinsey and his wife, Clara McMillen.

== Plot introduction ==
The Inner Circle revolves around the tensions that are bound to arise if a small group of people deliberately abandons the traditional moral values with which they were raised in favour of an unconventional outlook on love, marriage and sex. While Kinsey preaches that sex is nothing but a "hormonal function" devoid of emotion, John Milk has extreme difficulty adjusting to this concept where his own wife — the young and beautiful Iris — is concerned.

== Plot summary ==
Milk's sexual coming of age starts in 1939 when he is a student at Indiana University in Bloomington and attends Kinsey’s “marriage course”, a lecture in which the renowned zoologist propounds his theories and his plans for the first time in front of a large audience. Still a virgin, he makes Kinsey’s acquaintance when the latter interviews him in order to take his “sex history”. Kinsey makes Milk his personal assistant despite his inexperience, but he turns out to be a quick learner, and thus the young man becomes the first member of what will be “the inner circle”: a handful of men (and, up to a point, also their wives) who furiously collaborate under Kinsey’s dictatorial rule towards the publication of the two volumes later referred to as the Kinsey Report.

== Characters in The Inner Circle ==
- Alfred Kinsey – Professor conducting studies of sex at college Milk attends
- Clara "Mac" McMillen – Alfred's wife
- John Milk – Kinsey's assistant and protagonist
- Iris Milk – John's wife

== Literary significance and criticism ==
While the novel garnered generally favorable reviews, some reviewers and readers consider The Inner Circle to be one of Boyle’s lesser novels. The criticisms generally cite slow-moving and somewhat predictable plotting, as well as an overly-linear storyline.

The German translation of the novel by Dirk van Gunsteren (* 1953) bears the more lurid title Dr. Sex.

== Book information ==
The Inner Circle by T. C. Boyle

- Hardcover – ISBN 0-670-03344-8 (2004, First edition) published by Viking Press
- Paperback – ISBN 0-14-303586-X (2005) published by Penguin Books

== See also ==
- Alfred Kinsey (1894–1956)
- Kinsey Reports — Sexual Behavior in the Human Male (1948) and Sexual Behavior in the Human Female (1953)
- Kinsey Institute for Research in Sex, Gender and Reproduction
- Kinsey, a 2004 semi-biographical film starring Liam Neeson as Alfred Kinsey and Laura Linney as his wife Clara — seen by some as a companion piece to Boyle’s novel
- Free love
