= Water Music (novel) =

1981 novel by T. C. Boyle

- First edition
- Author: T. C. Boyle
- Language: English
- Publisher: Little Brown
- Publication date: 1981
- Publication place: United States
- Media type: Print (hardcover & paperback)
- Pages: 437 pp
- ISBN: 0-316-10467-1
- OCLC: 7733729
- Dewey Decimal: 813/.54 19
- LC Class: PS3552.O932 W3

Water Music is the first novel by T. C. Boyle, published in 1981. It is a semifictional historical fiction adventure set in the late 18th and early 19th centuries.

== Plot ==
The novel follows the parallel adventures and intertwining fates of its protagonists. Ned Rise is a luckless and purely fictional petty criminal traveling with the historically based explorer Mungo Park through various locales in Scotland and England, then on two Imperial British expeditions into Western Africa to explore the Niger River.

Water Music is loosely based on historical sources, including Mungo Park's 1799 book, Travels in the Interior Districts of Africa. Its foreword admits that Boyle does not claim historical accuracy nor faithfulness to dubious contemporary accounts.

In Library Journal, Michael Rogers says, "With his signature bawdy humor, Boyle presents 18th-century adventurers Ned Rise and Mungo Park, who join forces to make their way to the source of Africa's Niger River."

== Publication ==
- Hardcover - ISBN 0-316-10467-1 (1981, First edition) published by Little Brown
- Paperback - ISBN 0-14-006550-4 (1983) published by Penguin Books
