= The Road to Wellville (film) =

1994 American film by Alan Parker

- Theatrical release poster
- Directed by: Alan Parker
- Screenplay by: Alan Parker
- Based on: The Road to Wellville by T. C. Boyle
- Produced by: Alan Parker; Armyan Bernstein; Robert F. Colesberry
- Starring: Anthony Hopkins; Bridget Fonda; Matthew Broderick; John Cusack; Dana Carvey; Michael Lerner
- Cinematography: Peter Biziou
- Edited by: Gerry Hambling
- Music by: Rachel Portman
- Production companies: Beacon Communications; Dirty Hands Productions
- Distributed by: Columbia Pictures (United States and Canada; through Sony Pictures Releasing); J&M Entertainment (International)
- Release date: October 28, 1994
- Running time: 120 minutes
- Country: United States
- Language: English
- Budget: $25 million
- Box office: $26 million

The Road to Wellville is a 1994 American comedy drama film written, produced and directed by Alan Parker, an adaptation of T. C. Boyle's novel of the same name, which tells the story of the doctor and clean-living advocate John Harvey Kellogg and his methods employed at the Battle Creek Sanitarium at the beginning of the 20th century.

Starring Anthony Hopkins, Matthew Broderick, Bridget Fonda, John Cusack, Dana Carvey and Colm Meaney, the film was shot in New Paltz, New York at the Mohonk Mountain House. Other locations were the North Carolina community of Winnabow and city of Wilmington. It received mixed reviews from critics.

== Plot ==
Dr. John Harvey Kellogg opened a sanitarium in Battle Creek, Michigan, where he practiced his unusual methods for maintaining health, including colonic irrigation, electrical stimulus and sexual abstinence, vegetarianism and physical exercise. The sanitarium attracts well-to-do patients including William and Eleanor Lightbody, who are suffering from poor health following the death of their child. On their way to Battle Creek they meet Charles Ossining, who is hoping to make a fortune by exploiting the fad for health food cereals.

Ossining finds a partner in Goodloe Bender. Having enlisted the services of George Kellogg, the doctor's estranged adopted son, they attempt to produce "Kellogg's Perfo Flakes".

In the sanitarium, Will Lightbody is separated from his wife, and is soon harboring lustful thoughts toward Nurse Graves and patient Ida Muntz. His wife Eleanor, meanwhile, befriends Virginia Cranehill, who has a modern attitude toward sexual pleasure, influenced by the works of Dr. Lionel Badger. Will eventually succumbs to Ida Muntz's charms. Later he learns that Ida has died during treatment. Following the electrocution of a patient in the defective sinusoidal bath, and the discovery of yet another death, Will suffers a breakdown, flees the sanitarium, gets drunk and eats meat. At a restaurant, he meets Ossining, and agrees to invest $1,000 in his health food business. Will returns drunk to the sanitarium, where he is reprimanded by Dr. Kellogg and is abandoned by a distraught Eleanor.

Ossining's business is a disaster, with no edible product. He and the partners resort to stealing Kellogg's cornflakes and repackaging them in their own boxes. Ossining meets his aunt, his sole investor, on visiting day at Kellogg's sanitarium, and is there exposed as a fraud and arrested.

Nurse Graves attempts to seduce Will, who is guilt-stricken and spurns her advances. He searches for Eleanor, only to find her and Virginia Cranehill receiving clitoral massages from Dr. Spitzvogel while Dr. Badger masturbates. Will is incensed, thrashes Dr. Spitzvogel with a branch and takes Eleanor away.

George Kellogg visits his father, but things go badly. George burns down the sanitarium. In the ensuing chaos, Ossining escapes. Kellogg seems to reconcile with George in the mud bath in the aftermath of the fire.

In a final coda, the Lightbodys have reconciled and are happily married, with four daughters. Will receives a check for $1,000 from Ossining, who has become a cola beverage tycoon. Dr. Kellogg dies of a heart attack while diving from a high board.

== Cast ==
- Anthony Hopkins as Dr. John Harvey Kellogg
- Bridget Fonda as Eleanor Lightbody
- Matthew Broderick as William Lightbody
- John Cusack as Charles Ossining
- Dana Carvey as George Kellogg
  - Jacob Reynolds as Young George Kellogg
- Michael Lerner as Goodloe Bender
- Colm Meaney as Dr. Lionel Badger
- John Neville as Endymion Hart-Jones
- Lara Flynn Boyle as Ida Muntz
- Traci Lind as Nurse Graves
- Camryn Manheim as Virginia Cranehill
- Roy Brocksmith as Poultney Dab
- Norbert Weisser as Dr. Spitzvogel
- Monica Potter as Mrs. Tindermarsh

== Reception ==
=== Critical reception ===
The film received mixed reactions upon its release, with much criticism towards the scatological nature of the film. Hopkins' portrayal of Kellogg was also singled out for criticism. The film has a 41% rating on Rotten Tomatoes, based on 17 reviews. Not all reviews were negative. Writing in Bright Lights Film Journal, Tanfer Emin-Tunc commented: "It is a sophisticated blend of humor and documented historical material that seeks to question the various forms that race and class have assumed in twentieth-century American society."

On At the Movies, Gene Siskel called the film well made except for the script, saying it failed to draw any meaningful parallels between the health crazes of the early 1900s and the 1990s. He said the film "regularly interrupt[s] the farce with some naked bodies just to keep us awake—barely," and gave the films a thumbs-down. Siskel's colleague Roger Ebert gave the film a thumbs-up, agreeing that the film lacked a strong message but was nevertheless a "fascinating microcosm of American history."

Audiences polled by CinemaScore gave the film an average grade of "C−" on an A+ to F scale.

=== Box office ===
The film opened at number 5 at the US box office with $2,580,108 in its opening weekend. It grossed $6,562,513 in the US and Canada and $26 million worldwide. After regular showings on cable TV and a hard to find DVD release, the film became a cult classic and was finally released on Blu-ray by Shout! Factory in 2020.

== Year-end lists ==
- 5th worst – Peter Travers, Rolling Stone
- 5th worst – Janet Maslin, The New York Times
- Top 10 worst (not ranked) – Betsy Pickle, Knoxville News Sentinel
- Guilty pleasure – Douglas Armstrong, The Milwaukee Journal
- Dishonorable mention – Glenn Lovell, San Jose Mercury News
- #7 Worst - Jeffrey Lyons, Sneak Previews
