= After the Plague =

2001 collection of short stories by T. C. Boyle

- First edition (US)
- Author: T. C. Boyle
- Language: English
- Genre: Short stories
- Publisher: Viking Adult (US); Bloomsbury Publishing (UK)
- Publication date: September 10, 2001
- Media type: Print, e-book, audiobook
- Pages: 256 pages
- ISBN: 978-0-670-03005-7

After the Plague is a 2001 collection of short stories by T. C. Boyle. The book was released on September 10, 2001 through Viking Adult and contains sixteen stories, some of which were previously published in The New Yorker, O. Henry Prize Stories, and The Best American Short Stories.

== Synopsis ==
The collected stories range in subject matter, from the apocalyptic titular story "After the Plague" to "Peep Hall", which centers on a man discovering a website that streams live footage of a local house full of women. Other stories feature themes such as bullying and first love.

=== Stories in volume ===
- "Termination Dust"
- "She Wasn't Soft"
- "Killing Babies"
- "Captured by the Indians"
- "Achates McNeil"
- "Mexico"
- "The Love of My Life"
- "Rust"
- "Peep Hall"
- "Going Down"
- "Friendly Skies"
- "The Black and White Sisters"
- "Death of the Cool"
- "My Widow"
- "The Underground Gardens"
- "After the Plague"

== Reception ==
Critical reception for the collection was mostly positive. Sven Birkerts, reviewing for The New York Times, gave a mostly positive review to After the Plague, stating that he enjoyed the collection but that at times the characters overwhelm the stories and "subvert the deeper claims of the work". The Guardian praised the collection, noting that "Boyle writes so beautifully that it always feels natural, never forced." The Lexington Herald-Leader gave a more mixed review, opining that although the stories are "artfully woven" they are also "plagued by illogic".
