= The Harder They Come (novel) =

2015 novel by T. Coraghessan Boyle

- First edition
- Author: T. C. Boyle
- Language: English
- Genre: Literary fiction
- Publisher: Ecco Books
- Publication date: March 31, 2015
- Publication place: United States
- Media type: Print (hardcover)
- Pages: 400 pp
- ISBN: 978-0-06-234937-8
- Preceded by: San Miguel

The Harder They Come is a novel by T. C. Boyle published in March 2015. It is loosely based on events in the life of Aaron Bassler, who, like Adam Stensen in the novel, was the subject of a manhunt in Mendocino County, California for 36 days in 2011.

== Plot ==
The Harder They Come follows the unfolding relationship between Sten Stensen, his son Adam, and Adam's girlfriend Sara Hovarty Jennings. The story alternates between their three points of view. The story begins with Sten, a former Marine and Vietnam veteran, killing a mugger while on a vacation cruise in Puerto Limón, Costa Rica. The story then moves to California, where Sten is unable to understand or help his schizophrenic son Adam, who considers himself a "mountain man" modeled on his hero John Colter. Meanwhile, Adam begins a relationship with Sara, a believer in the Sovereign citizen movement. He considers her a kindred spirit due to her own problems with the law, and her professed belief in the illegitimacy of laws and law enforcement. Adam's paranoia worsens, leading him to shoot two people and escape into the mountains to avoid arrest.

== Critical reception ==
Michiko Kakutani of the New York Times called The Harder They Come "stunning" and "a masterly — and arresting — piece of storytelling, arguably Mr. Boyle’s most powerful, kinetic novel yet". Kakutani continues, The Harder They Come reaffirms Boyle's "fascination with characters who pit themselves against their neighbors, the system and nature; freedom as both a founding principle of America — and an invitation to rebellion and self-indulgence; and the dark fallout of ideological certainty and obsession."
