= Budding Prospects =

Novel by T. C. Boyle

Budding Prospects: A Pastoral
- US edition cover
- Author: T. C. Boyle
- Language: English
- Publisher: Viking Press
- Publication date: May 3, 1984
- Publication place: United States
- Media type: Print (hardback & paperback)
- Pages: 326 p.
- ISBN: 0-670-19439-5
- OCLC: 10146303
- Dewey Decimal: 813/.54 19
- LC Class: PS3552.O932 B8 1984

Budding Prospects: A Pastoral is a 1984 novel by T. C. Boyle. It details the misadventure of protagonist Felix Nasmyth, who plans to get rich quick by illegally growing marijuana.

== Plot ==
Felix Nasmyth, the first-person narrator, is a young man who, as he tells readers right at the beginning of the book, has "always been a quitter". Without any hopes for the future, he is persuaded by one of his few friends to take part in a "summer camp"—a secluded rural area in Mendocino County, California-and grow marijuana on a large scale.

The illegal business venture seems doomed from the start, but for once Nasmyth decides to prove something to himself and follow through. In the end, after many misadventures, the venture is a failure.

At the same time Nasmyth has made the acquaintance of a lovely girl and has fallen in love with her. He ends his narrative on an optimistic note, returning to the girl with plans to "plant a little seed".

== Themes ==
Capitalism, male fellowship, drug and alcohol abuse, and the war on drugs are all featured extensively throughout the book.

=== Capitalism ===
Capitalism in the North American tradition is examined throughout the book - although mostly from an illegal business framework. The book specifically focuses on the ironic use of capitalism by society's subversive elements. The financier of the project, Vogelsang, is described as an apprentice to Andrew Carnegie or Jay Gould, and involved in various investments and trading of commodities. Vogelsang's agricultural expert, Boyd Dowst, is described as an optimistic Yankee farmer with a master's degree from Yale. The opening two epigraphs quote Benjamin Franklin and the Death of a Salesman. A water pipeline, central to the survival of the group's crop and enterprise, comes under attack at various points in the book from a neighbor and a bear. At one point, the proprietor of an illegal glory-hole-based sexual business is described with great similarity to J. P. Morgan - his rosacea, his affinity for cigars, his cane, and a copy of The Wall Street Journal. In another passage, Felix expands upon the group's beliefs in and possible disillusionment with - if the project fails - the principles of the classless society, upward mobility, and the law of the jungle.

=== The war on drugs ===
The authorities are largely symbolized by the California Highway Patrol, and are one of the many threats to the group's illegal enterprise. Felix's paranoid thoughts focus on Officer Jerpbak, with whom he has several hostile and unrelated encounters throughout. The book is set during the high-profile war on drugs in Northern California administered by George Deukmejian in the early 1980s.

== Book information ==
Budding Prospects by T. C. Boyle

- Hardcover - ISBN 0-670-19439-5 (first edition) published by Viking Press
- Paperback - ISBN 0-14-029996-3 published by Penguin Books

== TV adaptation ==
In September, 2016, Amazon Video greenlit a pilot based on the book. The series stars Will Sasso as Gesh, and is directed by Terry Zwigoff. The pilot became available for streaming on March 17, 2017.
