= The Terranauts =

2016 novel by T. C. Boyle

- First edition cover
- Author: T. C. Boyle
- Cover artist: Jim Tierney
- Language: English
- Publisher: Ecco
- Publication date: October 25, 2016
- Publication place: New York
- Media type: Print (hardback)
- Pages: 528
- ISBN: 978-0-06-234940-8
- OCLC: 936619562
- Dewey Decimal: 813/.54
- LC Class: PS3552.O932 T47 2016

The Terranauts is a novel by T. C. Boyle, published in October 2016 by Ecco. It is set in a glassed-in biodome in Arizona, closely similar to the real-life Biosphere II. The plot focuses on two of the inside crew and one jealous outsider.

== Plot ==
Four men and four women are shut into Ecosphere 2, a glass-enclosed biodome near the fictional town of Tillman, Arizona, for a two-year scientific mission; the intention is that the environment is self-sufficient in food, water and oxygen. Three characters serve as narrators: insiders Dawn Chapman and Ramsay Roothoorp, and outsider Linda Ryu. Dawn and Ramsay quickly become one of several sexually active couples inside Ecosphere 2. Linda starts as Dawn's best friend but becomes a spy working for the mission management team. Dawn becomes pregnant and decides to give birth inside the Ecosphere rather than break closure, which has serious repercussions on the mission.

== Reception ==
Jason Heller for NPR applauded the novel as a success and commended the author's attention to detail, writing, "Boyle navigates his well-worn territory with sensitivity and finesse". Michael Berry of the San Francisco Chronicle similarly wrote, "What works best in the book is the detail with which Boyle portrays the nitty-gritty of life inside an enclosed environment". M. John Harrison for The Guardian praised the novel for having a unique and resonant brand of humor and wrote, "Boyle's dissections are far too accurate."

The Washington Post critic Ron Charles panned the novel as being very "dull" with "numbingly petty" characters and "no relief from their flat voices, their obvious confessions, their poisonous jealousy". Michael Upchurch for The Boston Globe wrote, "The Terranauts touches on fascinating issues. It's just that Boyle, with the characters he has cooked up, stacks the odds too heavily against E2's success from the outset." Henry Hitchings of the Financial Times described it as being occasionally "a striking portrait of vanity and weakness" but concluded, "Despite all Boyle's efforts to make the novel seem a spiritually charged experience and a religious allegory, it feels like an upmarket soap opera. There's too relentless a concern with which of the terranauts will pair off — and too much sprawling evocation of how and where they might do so."
