= East Is East (novel) =

1990 novel by T. Coraghessan Boyle

East is East
- US edition cover
- Author: T. C. Boyle
- Language: English
- Publisher: Viking Press
- Publication date: September 1, 1990
- Publication place: United States
- Media type: Print (hardback & paperback)
- Pages: 384 p. (First edition, hardcover)
- ISBN: 0-670-83220-0 (First edition, hardcover)
- OCLC: 20995751
- Dewey Decimal: 813/.54 20
- LC Class: PS3552.O932 E18 1990

East is East is a 1990 novel by American author T. Coraghessan Boyle.

== Book information ==
East is East by T. C. Boyle

- Hardcover: ISBN 0-670-83220-0 (First edition, September 1, 1990) published by Viking Press
- Paperback: ISBN 0-14-013167-1 (August 1, 1991) published by Penguin Books
