= Obed Hussey =

American inventor

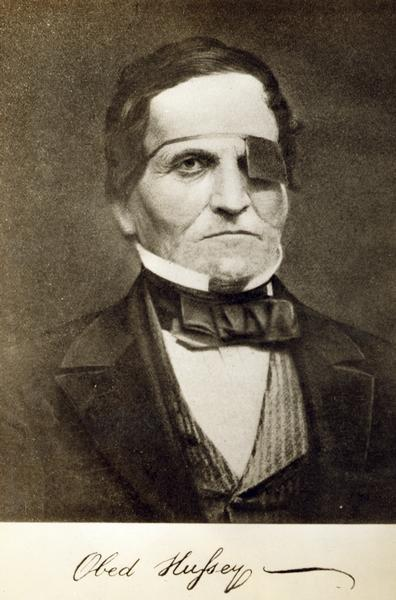
Obed Hussey circa 1850

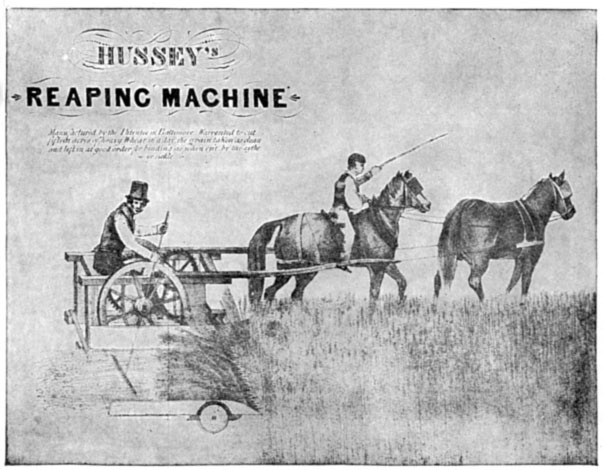
Poster for Hussey's Reaping Machine

Obed Hussey (1792–1860) was an American inventor. His most notable invention was a reaping machine, patented in 1833, that was a rival of a similar machine, patented in 1834, produced by Cyrus McCormick. Hussey also invented a steam plow, a machine for grinding out hooks and eyes, a mill for grinding corn and cobs, a husking machine, a machine for crushing sugar cane, a machine for making artificial ice, a candle-making machine, and other devices. However, he devoted the prime of his life to perfecting his reaping machine.

Although the Hussey reaper was ultimately surpassed in the marketplace by the reaping machines of Cyrus McCormick, Hussey was the first person to make, patent, and sell such a machine in the United States. His machine was first in that it was first to be patented and had been worked in at least eight states before McCormick's machine had left the valley of Virginia. Moreover, Hussey's cutting mechanism, the combination of a reciprocating knife and slotted guard fingers, became, with some further modifications, the standard one for use in harvesting machinery.

== Early life to 1820s ==
Obed Hussey was born in 1792 to a Quaker family in Maine, but moved at an early age to the island of Nantucket. Little is known of his early life, but as a young man, he sailed on whaling ships to the Pacific Ocean, where he was among the crew who would row after the whales. It may have been during a whaling trip that he lost the sight of one eye.

Whaling remained an occupation for Hussey into his thirties. From July 1820 to April 1823, he served on the crew of the whaleship Atlas on a voyage from Nantucket to the South Seas. During this voyage, off the coast of Chile late in the day on January 14, 1821, Hussey was aboard a whaleboat pursuing a sperm whale when the whale stoved in the whaleboat. He and the other crew members were thrown into the sea, but managed to stay afloat by hanging onto the partially submerged wreckage of the boat. The Atlas was too far away to be aware of what had happened and darkness soon fell. The crew were rescued only when a search boat from the Atlas happened upon them despite the darkness. Hussey kept journals detailing these experiences.

== The Hussey reaper ==
=== Initial development: 1831–1842 ===
By 1831, Hussey was at work on his reaping machine, spending at least part-time at an agricultural implements factory in Baltimore. However, the hilly landscape of Maryland made it an unsuitable location for a field trial, so when the machine was ready, Hussey took it to Ohio, where he had a supporter in Cincinnati who provided both financing and manufacturing facilities. Working in Cincinnati during the winter of 1832-1833, Hussey rebuilt his reaping machine there, completing it in time for the harvest of 1833. On July 2, 1833, Hussey exhibited his machine before the Hamilton County Agricultural Society near Carthage, Ohio, where it performed successfully. Hussey patented his machine later that year, on December 31, 1833.

In the spring of 1834, Mechanics' Magazine gave coverage to Hussey's reaper. That report was seen by Cyrus McCormick, who promptly wrote a letter to the editor claiming that he had invented and field-tested a reaping machine in 1831 and that use of the principles of the machine by others was an infringement of his rights. Thus began a fierce rivalry between Hussey and McCormick that would last more than a quarter of a century.

There had been unsuccessful attempts by others to build reaping machines before Hussey and McCormick. These included thirty-three English and twenty-two American inventions, as well as two French and one German. In the United States, seventeen patents for harvesting machines had been granted before that of Hussey, the earliest in 1803; however, Hussey's was the first "really practical" reaping machine to be patented.

As for McCormick, although he built and used a reaper in 1831, he did not patent it until 1834, about six months after Hussey's patent, nor had he sold reapers to others. Instead, after obtaining the patent, McCormick turned his attention to other business matters, selling no reapers until at least 1839. As of 1834, McCormick's reaper was still marginal, while Hussey's machine was a viable reaper.

Hussey gave successful demonstrations of his machine in 1834 in New York state and in 1835 in Missouri, New York state, and possibly also in Illinois, Ohio, and Indiana. In 1836, Hussey reapers achieved results in Maryland that enhanced Hussey's reputation. In 1837, he had some reapers manufactured in Maryland and up to six of them were sold there, while other Hussey machines were built in Cincinnati and marketed in Ohio, Indiana, and Missouri.

In August 1838, Hussey moved to Baltimore and that city became the home of the Hussey reaper. Also that year, his machine won praise from the Philadelphia Society for the Promotion of Agriculture and performed successfully elsewhere. For the 1839 harvest, ten or twelve machines were made and it was introduced in Delaware. Hussey also received favorable press notices that year.

For the 1840 harvest, Hussey made thirty-six machines with some gearing alterations, but, he said, "the credit of the machine suffered a retrograde." He also introduced the machine in Virginia. His market declined for the next three years, selling only two in 1843. In 1841, Virginia planters gave the Hussey machine mixed reviews, though it continued to be viewed favorably in the Genesee Valley of New York state.

The 1842 season brought increased competition from the Cyrus McCormick reaper and Hussey was able to sell only 10 machines, despite offering two models, the smaller of which was priced slightly below McCormick's. Nevertheless, Hussey's reaper "held first place" among all reapers in use prior to 1843.

=== The first "War of the Reapers" and its aftermath: 1843–1850 ===
Early in 1843, Hussey wrote a letter to the editor of Southern Planter, published in March of that year, in which he noted the attention McCormick's reaper had been given and expressed the intention of entering his reaper into contests with McCormick's; this marked the beginning of the first "war of the reapers." The field of battle was to be a farm near Richmond, Virginia in the region of the lower James River.

The contest was planned for June 30, 1843, but on June 27, Hussey learned that McCormick was operating his machine in the area, so Hussey brought his reaper to the same field and challenged McCormick to a competitive trial. With a small crowd of neighbors looking on, McCormick began cutting first. Before Hussey got started, a shower drenched the wheat. Hussey's machine could not cut the wet wheat, leaving McCormick the winner of this impromptu meet.

Hussey's luck continued to work against him for the main competition on June 30. Because a bridge had been swept away by high water, Hussey was unable to get his better, larger machine to the contest field. Instead, Hussey put his lesser, smaller machine up against McCormick's and it was unable to cut as much grain. McCormick was judged the winner, but under the circumstances, the jurors had reservations and Hussey protested the award.

One of the jurors invited an additional match in his fields the following week. The fields included some areas with tangled wheat. McCormick refused to try his machine there, while Hussey, this time with his larger machine, put his reaper to the task. The result was that he broke his sickle and rake. No winner was declared; nevertheless, the owner of the field concluded that Hussey's machine was better for use in heavy wheat. Hussey sold only two reapers following these contests, while McCormick sold twenty-nine.

In 1844, Hussey sought to show that his machine could cut hemp in Kentucky, and in 1845, Hussey reapers were used in the middle seaboard states, New York, Michigan, Illinois, Wisconsin, and probably in Ohio and Kentucky. However, during this period, Hussey focused on the eastern markets, where his machine was especially in use as a mower. In 1846, Hussey introduced his reapers in Champaign County, Ohio and arranged for local manufacture of his machines. Various testimonials from 1845 to 1850 report positive results for his reapers.

In the late 1840s, Hussey gained ground in the eastern seaboard states partly because McCormick's 1846 reapers suffered from poor workmanship in Virginia.

Hussey sold 50 or 60 reapers in 1850, and they were well received from Pennsylvania south to North Carolina. Hussey's machine of 1850 cut grass well, while McCormick's did not.

Thus, by 1850, the reaper of Obed Hussey "had proved its worth." By that year, however, many new competitors had entered the field because the original patents of both Hussey and McCormick had expired; both men were then forced to compete with their own ideas.

=== The second "War of the Reapers" and the 1850s ===
The first world's fair, an international exhibition of industrial arts known as the Exhibition of the Industry of All Nations, was planned for London in 1851. Hussey and McCormick both sought to expand their markets by displaying their reapers at this event, held at the newly-constructed Crystal Palace, a nineteen-acre conservatory of iron and glass, beginning May 1.

On July 24, a head-to-head trial of reapers by Hussey and McCormick, as well a third of English design, was held. Hussey and McCormick were both absent and Hussey's machine was operated by an agent who had never seen it work. When its cutter clogged, the operator did not know how to clear it, nor did he know how to adjust its platform, resulting in a failure of the rake. The English machine was also unsuccessful, but McCormick's reaper performed well enough to cut an estimated twenty acres a day.

At a second trial on August 6, while Hussey was in France, Hussey's reaper again did not work well; McCormick, who was present for this trial, was awarded a Grand Council Medal.

Hussey protested that the trials were unjust. He began demonstrating his machine in England and, with his personal supervision, it performed efficiently; his reputation revived. Another contest was set for 25 and 27 September 1851. Hussey's machine performed better and Hussey gained considerable prestige. Later that season, Hussey exhibited before Prince Albert, who then ordered two machines. Also in 1851, a Hussey machine made in England reached Austria.

Hussey again went to England in 1852 to promote his reaper. He had success in at least two contests early in the 1852 harvest, but when he took his reaper to Scotland, the Scottish juries awarded prizes to their own. Hussey returned to England for several months in 1853 and was apparently satisfied with his success. By 1855, however, the McCormick reaper had been adapted to English conditions and English buyers had shifted toward McCormick's machine. Nevertheless, by the late 1850s, Hussey had manufacturers in the British Isles making a version of his machine. These Hussey machines, priced lower than McCormick's, gained increasing favor, especially in Scotland.

In 1855, Hussey attended another world's fair, the International Exposition in Paris. This and the 1856 Agricultural Congress, also in Paris, provided opportunities to demonstrate Hussey's reaper in France. Hussey achieved a "gratifying measure of success," but was unable to win the top awards, which went to McCormick. In 1857, a Hussey machine made in Vienna was defeated by a McCormick machine in a field trial in heavy rye near Budapest.

During this same period back in the United States, the rivalry between Hussey and McCormick had continued. Hussey won a contest with McCormick during the 1852 Ohio harvest, while trials in Geneva, New York were inconclusive. Hussey gained ground in Maryland when McCormick failed to appear for a planned contest there. In 1853, Hussey received two votes to McCormick's one in a Virginia trial, while another maker's machine received two votes as well. Hussey's machine also held its own in a North Carolina match in 1854. That year Hussey also won a bronze medal at the New York Crystal Palace and a premium at the Pennsylvania Agricultural Society.

In 1855, Hussey's factory in Baltimore produced 521 reaping machines, its maximum annual output, up from 385 in 1854. In the following years, however, his output declined, with annual totals of 163, 95, 19, 10, and 24, respectively, for the years 1856 through 1860. Between 1848 and 1860, McCormick manufactured more than ten times as many reaping machines as did Hussey, and by 1857, Hussey was no longer a serious competitor in the harvest field.

=== Patent matters ===
Hussey's 1833 patent, good for a term of fourteen years, was scheduled to expire at the end of 1847. In 1845, he contacted the patent commissioner about obtaining an extension, but was advised to delay the application for renewal until near the end of the original term. He did so, but apparently not knowing that he was required to apply for a renewal at least thirty days before expiration of the patent, he waited until just ten or twelve days before the expiration date. Having missed the legal deadline for a renewal through the patent office, Hussey could get a renewal only through an appeal to Congress for an extension.

Meanwhile, Hussey had secured patents for an improvement to the reaping machine: "his famous open-back guard fingers." Patented on August 7, 1847, this improvement involved leaving openings at the back end of the slot in the guards for the escape of particles of straw or grass that might get in between the blades and guards. This served to prevent choking of the blades in the guards. Hussey saw his 1847 improvements as "perfecting" his reaper.

In 1848, Cyrus McCormick also faced the expiration of his original patent and he sought an extension through the patent office. Hussey and others opposed this extension. Hussey took the position that he opposed McCormick's extension as a matter of self-defense, because McCormick had petitioned Congress against Hussey's extension. On March 29 of that year, the patent office denied McCormick's application for an extension.

The denial of McCormick's extension by the patent office meant that both Hussey and McCormick could get extensions of their original reaper patents only through Congress. Hussey's case for renewal was in part that he had not received sufficient compensation from his invention; rather than earning profit from his 1833 patent, Hussey had spent the fourteen-year term of the patent working to perfect his invention "without any return for time and labor," leaving him "at the very door of poverty." Bills that would have extended Hussey's patent were introduced in 1848, 1854, and 1856, but the matter ultimately was tabled. McCormick also was unable to win an extension through Congress.

In April 1857, Hussey obtained a reissue of his 1847 patent covering an open-back guard finger in combination with a vibrating scallop-edged cutter. He then sued McCormick, claiming infringement of the 1847 patent and seeking damages and an injunction to prevent further sales of the McCormick reaper. On September 19, 1859, the court ruled in favor of Hussey, finding that Hussey was the first inventor of the combination of the open-slotted guard finger and scalloped cutter, awarding damages of $80,000, and ordering McCormick to pay licensing fees to Hussey.

Also in 1859, Hussey sold his 1847 patent rights for $200,000. The buyer was a "syndicate of patent lawyers" who adapted the invention into a mowing-machine.

In 1861, after Hussey's death, his heirs successfully obtained an extension of his 1847 patents. Various manufacturers paid royalties to the Hussey heirs during the following years.

== Hussey the man: personal characteristics ==
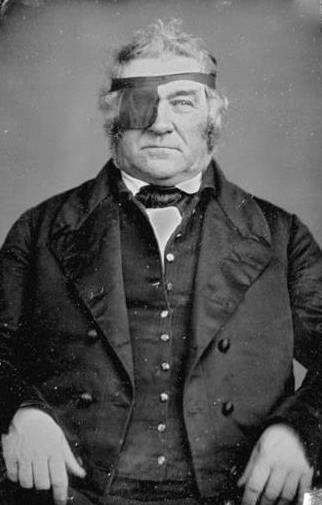
Hussey, later in life

Admiring descriptions of Obed Hussey, "one of nature's noblemen," are readily available. It has been said that he:

- "was warm hearted, genial and companionable."
- "maintained a reputation for uprightness and probity."
- was "inventive, poetic, and as whimsical as the weather."
- was "[e]xtremely sensitive, modest and unassuming, generous almost to a fault.".
- had a "great amiability of disposition and kindness of heart which made him many friends."

Moreover, he was "highly educated, cultured and refined; a philosopher as well as a writer of both poetry and prose, of more than ordinary ability." His writings included four journals chronicling whaling voyages and two manuscript volumes of poetry.

In matters of religion, Hussey was a Quaker who maintained his affiliation throughout his life. Records show that he transferred his membership from Quaker meeting to Quaker meeting when he changed his residence.

While in his personal life Hussey may have been "the picture of Quaker beneficence" and "without an enemy in the world," his business adversaries saw him as "a fiercely tenacious, one-eyed devil" who "must be watched with caution." In this context, at least, his modesty has been called a myth and his "common reputation for lack of aggressiveness" has been said to be "disproved by almost every move of his career." Nevertheless, observers have concluded that Hussey was not skilled in matters of business, citing his reluctance to incorporate into his machine any features he did not personally invent and his failure to make much money from his invention.

Hussey's strength was as an inventor and in that regard he was called a "genius," albeit an "erratic" one. He worked incessantly at his inventions throughout his life.

== Marriage and children ==
In 1856, Hussey married Eunice B. Starbuck, a 24-year-old who had also grown up on Nantucket. They had two daughters. The family resided in Baltimore.

== Death ==
On 4 August 1860, a Saturday, Hussey, on a trip to visit friends and family in Boston and Portland, was traveling by train from Boston to Portland, accompanied by his wife, their infant daughter, and a servant. As was the practice at the time, the train carried no water for passengers, but instead made stops where passengers could get off the train and get water. At such a stop in Exeter, New Hampshire, Hussey got off the train to retrieve some water for the child of a fellow passenger. While he was off the train, it started up unexpectedly. Hastily attempting to reboard the train, Hussey took a misstep, fell between two cars, and was run over.

The train was stopped but he had been killed instantly. His body was taken back on the train and was accompanied by his family, in great distress, on to Portland, later to be removed to Baltimore, where he was buried at Green Mount Cemetery.
