= The Women (Boyle novel) =

2009 novel by T. C. Boyle

- First edition
- Author: T. C. Boyle
- Language: English
- Publisher: Viking Press
- Publication date: February 10, 2009
- Publication place: United States
- Media type: Print (hardcover)
- Pages: 464 pp
- ISBN: 978-0-670-02041-6
- OCLC: 233548516
- Dewey Decimal: 813/.54 22
- LC Class: PS3552.O932 W66 2009

The Women is a 2009 novel by T. C. Boyle. It is a fictional account of American architect Frank Lloyd Wright's life, told through his relationships with four women: the young Montenegrin dancer Olgivanna; Miriam, the "morphine-addicted and obsessive Southern belle"; Mamah, whose life ended in a massacre at Taliesin, the home Wright built for his lovers and wives; and his first wife, Kitty, the mother of six of his children."

== Book information ==
The Women by T. C. Boyle

- Hardcover - ISBN 978-0-670-02041-6 (2009, First edition) published by Viking Press
