= The Tortilla Curtain =

1995 novel by T.C. Boyle

Tortilla Curtain
- First US edition cover
- Author: T. C. Boyle
- Cover artist: Neil Stuart
- Language: English
- Publisher: Viking Press
- Publication date: 1995
- Publication place: United States
- Media type: Print (hardback & paperback)
- Pages: 368 p.
- ISBN: 0-670-85604-5
- OCLC: 31900353
- Dewey Decimal: 813/.54 20
- LC Class: PS3552.O932 T67 1995

The Tortilla Curtain is a 1995 novel by American author T.C. Boyle. It is about middle-class values, illegal immigration, xenophobia, poverty, and environmental destruction. In 1997, it was awarded the French Prix Médicis Étranger prize for best foreign novel.

== Plot summary ==
Cándido Rincón (33) and América (his pregnant common-law wife, 17) are two Mexicans who enter the United States illegally, dreaming of a good life in their own little house somewhere in California. Meanwhile, they are homeless and camping at the bottom of the Topanga Canyon area of Los Angeles, in the hills above Malibu. Another couple, Delaney and Kyra Mossbacher, have recently moved into a gated community on top of Topanga, in order to be closer to nature yet be close enough to the city to enjoy those amenities. Kyra is a successful real estate agent while Delaney keeps house, looks after Kyra's son by her first marriage and writes a regular column for an environmentalist magazine.

The two couples' paths cross unexpectedly when Cándido is hit and injured by Delaney, who is driving his car along the suburban roads near his home. For different reasons, each man prefers not to call the police or an ambulance. Cándido is afraid of being deported and Delaney is afraid of ruining his perfect driving record. Delaney soothes his conscience by giving Cándido "$20 blood money," explaining to Kyra that "He's a Mexican." From that moment on, the lives of the two couples are constantly influenced by the others.

After the accident, Cándido's problems deepen. At first he can't work after being injured by the car crash and when he does not find a temporary job at a local work exchange anymore, he unavailingly tries to find one in the city, hoping to save money for an apartment in the North despite the low wages offered. With América, his wife, pregnant, his shame at not being able to get a job and procure a home and food for his family increases, especially when América decides to find some illegal—and possibly dangerous—work herself. At one point in the novel, after Cándido is robbed by some Mexicans in the city, they are forced to go through the trash cans behind a fast-food restaurant so they do not starve.

The Mossbachers, Delaney's family, are also having problems of their own, though of an altogether different nature. Comfortably settled in their new home, in a gated community, they are faced with the cruelty of nature when one of their two pet dogs is killed by a coyote. In addition, the majority of inhabitants of their exclusive estate feel increasingly disturbed and threatened by the presence of—as they see it—potentially criminal, illegal immigrants and vote for a wall to be built around the whole estate.

Cándido has a stroke of luck when he is given a free turkey at a grocery store by another customer, who has just received it through the store's Thanksgiving promotion. When Cándido starts roasting the bird back in their shelter, he inadvertently causes a fire which spreads so quickly that even the gated community the Mossbachers live in has to be evacuated.

In the midst of the escalating disasters, América gives birth to Socorro, a daughter, who she suspects might be blind. But the couple has no money to see the doctor. Delaney stalks Cándido back to their shack. He carries a gun, but does not intend to kill Cándido with it. Meanwhile, América tells Cándido about the night when she was raped, as she suspects that the baby's blindness was caused by a venereal disease transmitted by the rapist. Just as she is telling him this, Delaney finds their shack and is about to confront Cándido about the forest fire, when the shack is knocked over in a landslide. Cándido and América manage to save themselves, but Socorro drowns in a river. The book ends with Cándido helping Delaney out of the river. Time and again in the novel, however, it is hinted at that the real perpetrators can be found inside rather than outside the projected wall: well-to-do people insensitive to the plight of the have-nots.

== Book information ==
Tortilla Curtain by T.C. Boyle

- Hardcover – ISBN 0-670-85604-5 (1995, First Edition)
- Hardcover – ISBN 1-56895-287-2 (1996, Large Type Edition)
- Paperback – ISBN 0-14-023828-X (1996)

== Similar and related works ==
- In Bharati Mukherjee's novel Jasmine (1989), a young Indian woman living as an illegal alien in the United States tries to make ends meet.
- American musical group Eddie From Ohio's song "Cándido & América" is based on the novel.

== Adaptations ==
A script was completed by Dayan Ballweg in about 2003 and a planned film adaptation was announced at that time. By early 2007, Kevin Costner and Meg Ryan were attached to the project. It was slated for release in 2010, but has been pushed back with no known release date as of March 2012.

Playwright Matthew Spangler adapted Tortilla Curtain for the stage. It received its world premiere production at the San Diego Repertory Theatre in March/April 2012.
