= T. C. Boyle =

American novelist and short-story writer

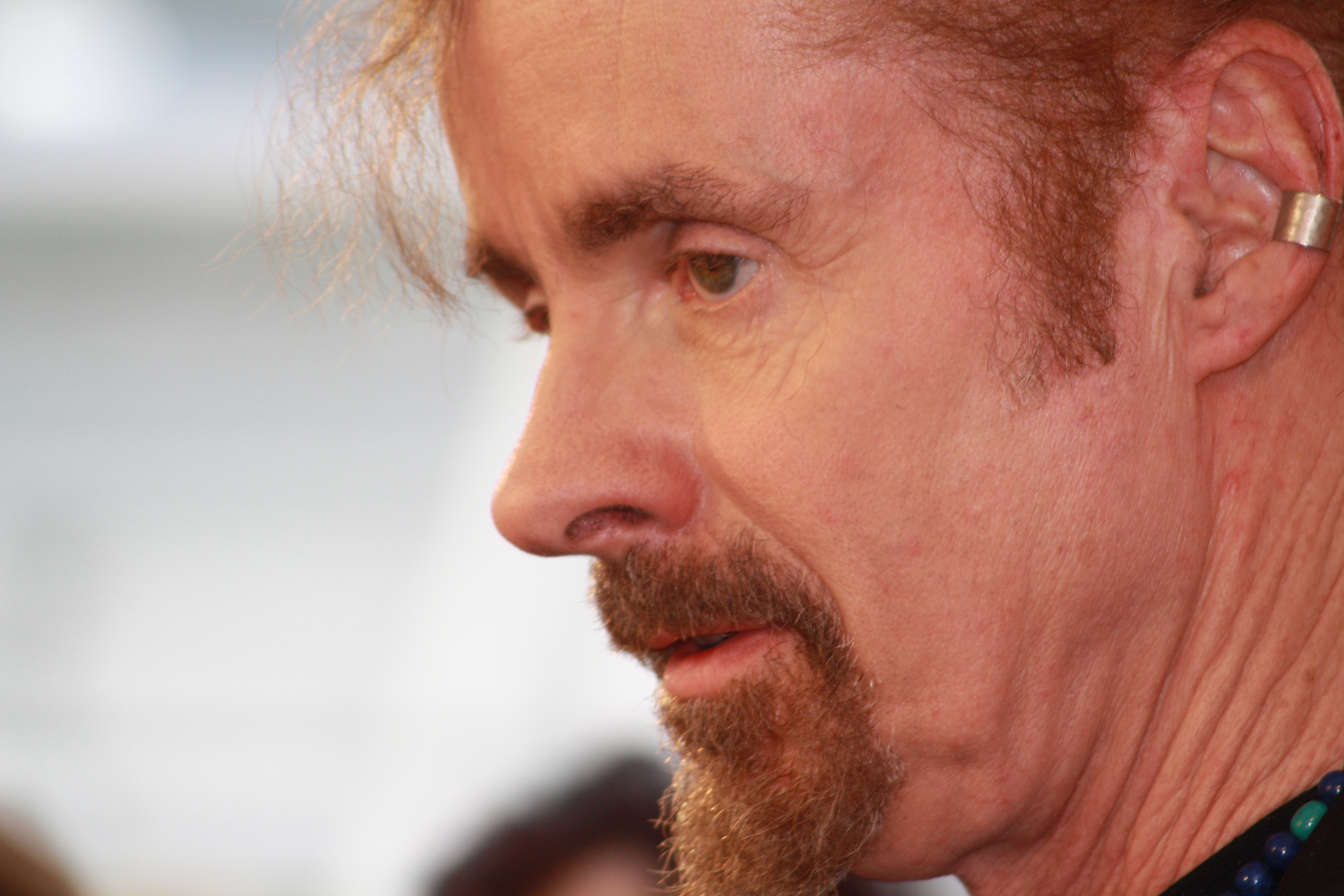
- T. C. Boyle at the Leipzig Book Fair in 2009
- Born: Thomas John Boyle, Jr. December 2, 1948 (age 77); Peekskill, New York, U.S.
- Education: State University of New York at Potsdam (BA); University of Iowa Writers' Workshop (MFA); University of Iowa (PhD)
- Occupation: Writer
- Writing career
- Period: 1975–present
- Genres: Novels, comic novels
- Notable awards: PEN/Faulkner Award for Fiction, 1988
- Website: tcboyle.com

Thomas Coraghessan Boyle (born December 2, 1948) is an American novelist and short story writer. Since the mid-1970s, he has published thirty one novels and more than 150 short stories. He won the PEN/Faulkner Award in 1988, for his third novel, World's End, which recounts 300 years in upstate New York.

He was previously a Distinguished Professor of English at the University of Southern California.

== Early life ==
T. C. Boyle was born Thomas John Boyle, the son of Thomas John Boyle, a school bus driver, and his wife Rosemary Post Boyle (later Rosemary Murphy), a school secretary. He grew up in Peekskill, New York and changed his middle name to Coraghessan when he was 17 after an ancestor of his mother. He received a B.A. in English and History from the State University of New York at Potsdam (1968), an M.F.A. (1974) from the Iowa Writers' Workshop, and a Ph.D. (1977) from the University of Iowa.

== Literary characteristics ==
In Understanding T. C. Boyle, Paul William Gleason writes, "Boyle's stories and novels take the best elements of Carver's minimalism, Barth's postmodern extravaganzas, García Márquez's magical realism, O'Connor's dark comedy and moral seriousness, and Dickens' entertaining and strange plots and brings them to bear on American life in an accessible, subversive, and inventive way."

Many of Boyle's novels and short stories explore the baby boom generation, its appetites, joys, and addictions. His themes, such as the often-misguided efforts of the male hero and the slick appeal of the anti-hero, appear alongside brutal satire, humor, and magical realism. His fiction also explores the ruthlessness and the unpredictability of nature and the toll human society unwittingly takes on the environment.

Boyle has published eleven collections of short stories, including Descent of Man (1979), Greasy Lake (1985), If the River Was Whiskey (1989), and Without a Hero (1994). His short stories frequently appear in the major American magazines, including The New Yorker, Harper's, Esquire, The Atlantic Monthly and Playboy, as well as on the radio show Selected Shorts.

== Influences ==
Boyle has said Gabriel García Márquez is his favorite novelist. He is also a fan of Flannery O'Connor and Robert Coover.

== Personal life ==
Boyle is married to Karen Kvashay. They have three children and live in Montecito near Santa Barbara, California. Their home was imperiled in the 2017 Thomas Fire which consumed 440 square miles and over 1,000 structures in Santa Barbara and Ventura counties, killing a firefighter in the latter. The fires denuded drought-stricken hillsides of vegetation and torrential rains in January 2018 subsequently dislodged immense boulders and precipitated mudslides which destroyed over one hundred homes and killed almost two dozen of his neighbors. Over 10,000 people were evacuated from Montecito as a result of the sequence of natural disasters. Boyle extensively documented both calamities on his website, and additionally in an article for The New Yorker.

== Awards and honors ==
- Coordinating Council of Literary Magazines Fiction Award for the Short Story, 1977.
- National Endowment for the Arts fellowship, 1977.
- The St. Lawrence Award for Fiction, best story collection of the year, 1980 (Descent of Man).
- The Paris Review's Aga Khan Prize for Fiction, 1981 ("Mungo Among the Moors", excerpt from Water Music).
- National Endowment for the Arts fellowship, 1983.
- The Paris Review's John Train Humor Prize, 1984 ("The Hector Quesadilla Story").
- Commonwealth of California, Silver Medal for Literature, 55th Annual Awards, 1986 (Greasy Lake).
- Editors' Choice, New York Times Book Review, one of the 16 best books of the year, 1987 (World's End).
- Guggenheim Fellowship, 1988.
- PEN/Faulkner Award, best novel of the year, 1988, for World's End.
- O. Henry Award, 1988. "Sinking House", from The Atlantic Monthly.
- Commonwealth Club of California Gold Medal for Literature, best novel of the year, 57th annual awards, 1988 (World's End).
- O. Henry Award, 1989. "The Ape Lady in Retirement", from The Paris Review.
- Prix Passion publishers' prize, France, for best novel of the year, 1989 (Water Music).
- PEN Center West Literary Prize, best short story collection of the year, 1989 (If the River Was Whiskey).
- Editors' Choice, New York Times Book Review, one of the 13 best books of the year, 1989 (If the River Was Whiskey).
- Doctor of Humane Letters honorary degree, State University of New York, 1991.
- Howard D. Vursell Memorial Award from the National Academy of Arts and Letters, for prose excellence, 1993.
- Best American Stories selection, 1997. "Killing Babies", from The New Yorker.
- Prix Médicis Étranger, Paris, for the best foreign novel of the year, 1997 (The Tortilla Curtain).
- O.Henry Award, 1999. "The Underground Gardens", from The New Yorker.
- The Bernard Malamud Prize in Short Fiction from the PEN/Faulkner Foundation, 1999, for T. C. Boyle Stories, the Collected Stories.
- O.Henry Award, 2001. "The Love of My Life", from The New Yorker.
- Southern California Booksellers' Association Award for best fiction title of the year, 2002, for After the Plague.
- National Book Award Finalist, Drop City, 2003.
- O. Henry Award, 2003. "Swept Away", from The New Yorker.
- Editors' Choice, New York Times Book Review, one of 9 best books of the year, 2003.
- Best American Stories selection, 2004. "Tooth and Claw", from The New Yorker.
- Founder's Award, Santa Barbara Writers' Conference, 2006.
- Evil Companions Literary Award, Denver Public Library, 2007.
- Commonwealth Club of California Silver Medal for Literature, 76th annual awards, 2007 (Talk Talk).
- Audie Prize, 2007, for best audio performance by a writer (The Tortilla Curtain).
- Ross Macdonald Award for body of work by a California writer, 2007.
- National Magazine Award, 2007 ("Wild Child", from McSweeney's).
- Best American Stories selection, 2007 ("Balto", from The Paris Review).
- Best American Stories selection, 2008 ("Admiral", from Harper's).
- Induction into the American Academy of Arts and Letters, 2009.
- Rea Award for the Short Story, 2014.
- Kenyon Review Award for Literary Achievement, 2019.

== Bibliography ==
=== Novels ===
- Water Music (1981)
- Budding Prospects: A Pastoral (1984)
- World's End (1987)
- East Is East (1990)
- The Road to Wellville (1993)
- The Tortilla Curtain (1995)
- Riven Rock (1998)
- A Friend of the Earth (2000)
- Drop City (2003)
- The Inner Circle (2004)
- Talk Talk (2006)
- The Women (2009)
- When the Killing's Done (2011)
- San Miguel (2012)
- The Harder They Come (2015)
- The Terranauts (2016)
- Outside Looking In (2019)
- Talk to Me (2021)
- Blue Skies (2023)
- No Way Home (2026)

=== Short fiction ===
==== Collections ====
- Descent of Man (1979)
- Greasy Lake & Other Stories (1985)
- If the River Was Whiskey (1989)
- Without a Hero (1994)
- T.C. Boyle Stories (1998), compiles four earlier volumes of short fiction plus seven previously uncollected stories
- After The Plague (2001)
- Tooth and Claw (2005)
- The Human Fly (2005), previously published stories collected as young adult literature
- Wild Child & Other Stories (2010)
- T.C. Boyle Stories II (2013), compiles three volumes of short fiction (After the Plague, Tooth and Claw, Wild Child) with a new collection of 14 stories entitled "A Death in Kitchawank"
- The Relive Box & Other Stories (2017)
- I Walk Between the Raindrops (2022)

==== List of stories ====
The following list is a selection of the many short stories Boyle has written:

Title	Year	First published	Reprinted/collected	Notes
"My Pain Is Worse Than Your Pain"	2010	Boyle, T. Coraghessan (January 2010). "My Pain Is Worse Than Your Pain". Harper's. Vol. 320, no. 1916. pp. 57–64.	"A Death in Kitchawank" (2013)	
"The Night of the Satellite"	2013	Boyle, T. Coraghessan (April 15, 2013). "The Night of the Satellite". The New Yorker. Vol. 89, no. 9. pp. 62–69.	"A Death in Kitchawank" (2013)	
"Sic Transit"	2013	Boyle, T. Coraghessan (October 2013). "Sic Transit". Harper's. Vol. 327, no. 1961. pp. 85–94.	"A Death in Kitchawank" (2013)	
"The Relive Box"	2014	Boyle, T. Coraghessan (March 17, 2014). "The Relive Box". The New Yorker. Vol. 90, no. 4. pp. 58–65.	The Relive Box & Other Stories (2017)	
"Are We Not Men?"	2016	Boyle, T. Coraghessan (November 7, 2016). "Are We Not Men?". The New Yorker. Vol. 92, no. 36. pp. 56–63.	The Relive Box & Other Stories (2017)	
"Asleep at the Wheel"	2019	Boyle, T. Coraghessan (February 11, 2019). "Asleep at the Wheel". The New Yorker. Vol. 94, no. 48. pp. 54–61.	I Walk Between the Raindrops (2022)	
"The Pool"	2025	Boyle, T. Coraghessan (September 22, 2025). "The Pool". The New Yorker		

=== Edited anthology ===
- DoubleTakes (2004, co-edited with K. Kvashay-Boyle)

=== Chronology and settings ===
Title	Time	Setting	Historical personage in the novel
World's End (1987)	Late 17th century, 1949 and 1968	Northern Westchester County near Peekskill, New York	-----
Water Music (1982)	1795	London, Scotland, and Africa (source of the Niger)	Mungo Park
The Road to Wellville (1993)	1907	Battle Creek, Michigan	John Harvey Kellogg
Riven Rock (1998)	1905–1925	Montecito, Santa Barbara County, California	Stanley McCormick, Katharine McCormick
The Women (2009)	Early 20th century up to 1930s	Wisconsin, Chicago, Japan	Frank Lloyd Wright
The Inner Circle (2004)	1940s–50s	Bloomington, Indiana	Alfred Kinsey
Drop City (2003)	1970	California, Alaska	-----
Budding Prospects (1984)	1980s	California	-----
East Is East (1990)	1980s	Georgia (American South)	Hu Tu Mei
The Tortilla Curtain (1995)	1990s	Southern California	-----
Talk Talk (2006)	2000s	California and New York state	-----
When the Killing's Done (2011)	2000s, 1970s, 1940s	California (Channel Islands)	-----
A Friend of the Earth (2000)	late 1980s; 2025–2026	California, Oregon	-----
The Harder They Come (2015)	2011	Mendocino County, California, including Fort Bragg and Willits	-----

== Adaptations ==
Boyle's novel The Road to Wellville was adapted into a film in 1994, by writer-director Alan Parker. It starred Anthony Hopkins, Matthew Broderick, Bridget Fonda, John Cusack, Dana Carvey, and Colm Meaney. The film was not well received either critically or financially, and was considered a box-office flop and appeared on several critics' worst-of-the-year lists.
