= Codman =

Codman may refer to:

== Buildings ==
- Codman Building, historic building at 55 Kilby Street, Boston, Massachusetts
- Codman House, historic house set on a 16-acre (65,000 m^{2}) estate at 36 Codman Road, Lincoln, Massachusetts
- Codman–Davis House, four-story, red brick, 1906, classical revival house in Washington, D.C.
  - Codman Carriage House and Stable, historic former carriage house and stable in Washington, D.C.
- Col. Charles Codman Estate, historic house at 43 Ocean View Avenue in Barnstable, Massachusetts

== People ==
- Charles Codman Cabot (1900–1976), American jurist
- Charles Codman (1800–1842), landscape painter of Portland, Maine
- Charles R. Codman (Civil War) (1828–1918), American military commander during the Civil War.
- Charles R. Codman (1893–1956), American author, wine expert, and aide to General George S. Patton during World War II
- Ernest Amory Codman (1869–1940), Boston surgeon who pioneered outcome-based health care
- Henry Codman Potter (1835–1908), bishop of the Episcopal Church of the United States
- Henry Sargent Codman (1863–1893), American landscape architect in Frederick Law Olmsted's design firm
- John Amory Codman (1824–1886), artist in Boston, Massachusetts
- John Codman Ropes (1836–1899), American military historian and lawyer born at St. Petersburg
- Julian Codman (1870–1932), lawyer involved with Anti-Imperialist League
- Ogden Codman (1863–1951), American architect, interior decorator and co-author of The Decoration of Houses (1897)
- Robert Codman (1859–1915), bishop of the Episcopal Diocese of Maine
- Stephen Codman (1796–1852), Canadian composer

== Other ==
- Codman Square District, historic district in Boston, Massachusetts
- Codman's triangle, area of new subperiosteal bone that is created when a lesion raises the periosteum away from the bone
