= Charles R. Codman (soldier, born 1828) =

American military figure and politician

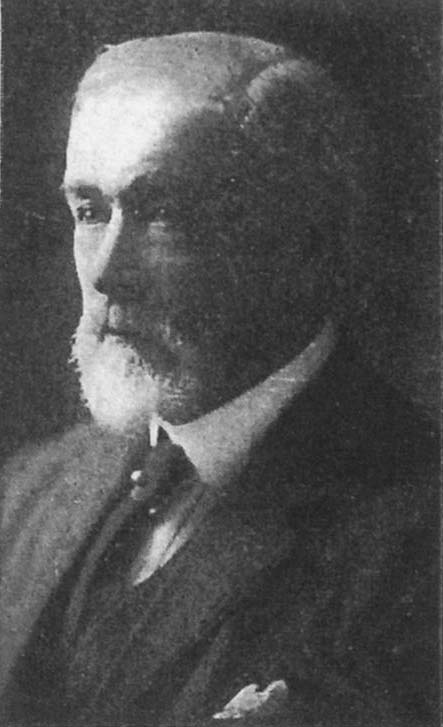
- Codman, published 1916
- Born: October 29, 1828; Paris, France
- Died: October 5, 1918 (aged 89); Cotuit, Massachusetts
- Relatives: Julian Codman (son); Col. Charles R. Codman (grandson); Russell S. Codman Jr. (grandson); Paul Codman Cabot (grandson); Charles Codman Cabot (grandson)
- Military career
- Allegiance: United States of America
- Branch: Union Army
- Service years: 1861–1863
- Rank: Colonel
- Commands: 45th Massachusetts Infantry Regiment
- Conflicts: Battle of Kinston; Battle of White Hall
- Other work: Member of the Massachusetts General Court

Charles Russell Codman (October 29, 1828 – October 5, 1918) was an American military officer and politician who served as commander of the 45th Massachusetts Infantry Regiment.

== Early life ==
Codman was born on October 29, 1828, in Paris, France to Charles Russell and Anne (Macmaster) Codman. The Codman family history in Boston and Charlestown goes back to the 1640s. He was educated in private schools, including at one of William Augustus Muhlenberg's model schools on Long Island. He graduated from Harvard College in 1849 and thereafter studied law in the office of Charles G. Loring. Codman was admitted to the bar in 1852 and practiced for a short time before entering the business world.

== Personal life ==
On February 28, 1856, Codman married Lucy Lyman Paine Sturgis, daughter of Russell Sturgis, in Walton-on-Thames. They had nine children, five of which (Russell Sturgis, John Sturgis, Julian, Anne Macmaster Cabot and Susan Welles Fiske) survived into adulthood. Anne Macmaster (Codman) Cabot was the mother of Paul Codman Cabot and Charles Codman Cabot. Russell Sturgis Codman was the father of Russell S. Codman Jr. and Charles R. Codman.

The Codmans resided at the Col. Charles Codman Estate in Cotuit, Massachusetts, and spent their winters in Boston. Codman's Cotuit home was constructed in 1867 on Bluff Point. The Victorian Stick mansion was built by Charles L. Baxter based on John Hubbard Sturgis's plans for Andrew Lovell's Red House. Codman also resided for many years at 123 High Street in Brookline, Massachusetts.

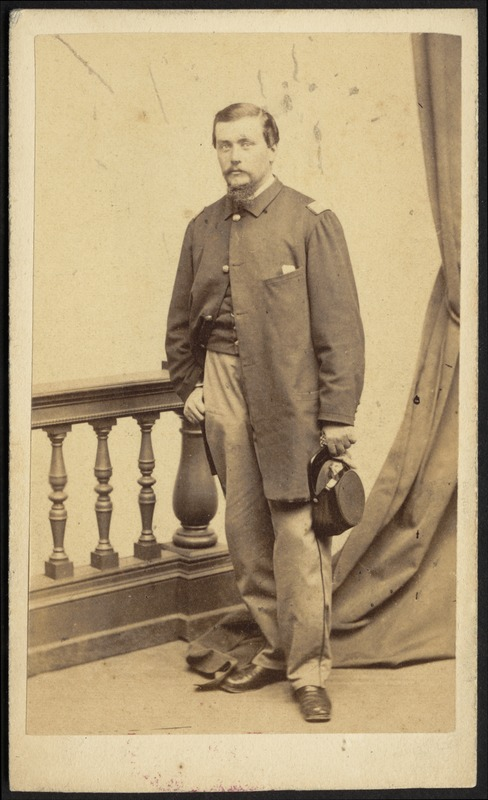
Codman in his uniform, taken by James Wallace Black

== Civil War ==
On March 12, 1861, Codman enlisted in the Union Army as captain and adjutant. In 1862 he was commissioned into the Boston Cadets at Fort Warren. Following President Abraham Lincoln's July 1, 1862, call for three hundred thousand soldiers, the Cadets began recruiting a nine month regiment. Codman was selected to be commander of this regiment, which was to be known as the 45th Massachusetts Infantry Regiment. Codman led the regiment during the Battles of Kinston and White Hall, as well as in skirmishes in and around New Bern, North Carolina. On July 21, 1863, the 45th Massachusetts was discharged from service.

== Political career ==
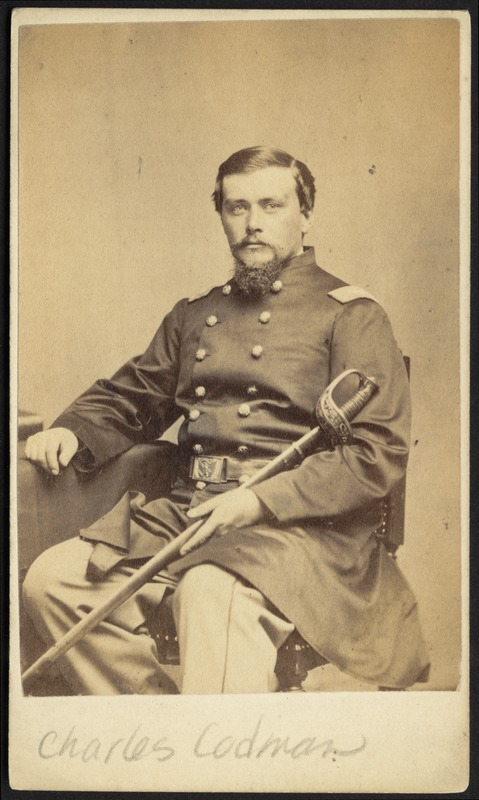
Codman in the 1860s, photographed by John Adams Whipple

Codman served on the Boston school committee in 1861 and 1862, in the Massachusetts Senate in 1864 and 1865, and in the Massachusetts House of Representatives from 1872 to 1875. He was the Republican nominee in the 1878 Boston mayoral election, but lost to Democrat Frederick O. Prince 52% to 47%. In 1884, Codman joined the Mugwump movement in support of Democrat presidential candidate Grover Cleveland due to his opposition to the Republican nominee James G. Blaine. The Democrats support of low tariffs led Codman to join the party for good and in 1890 he ran for the United States House of Representatives as an Independent Democrat.

== Other work ==
Codman was president of the Harvard Board of Overseers in 1888, 1881, 1879, and 1880. He also served as president of the Massachusetts Homeopathic Hospital.

== Death ==
Codman died on October 5, 1918, at his home in Cotuit, Massachusetts.
