= Cahoon Museum of American Art =

Museum in Cotuit, Massachusetts, US

Coordinates: 41.6381°N 70.45087°W

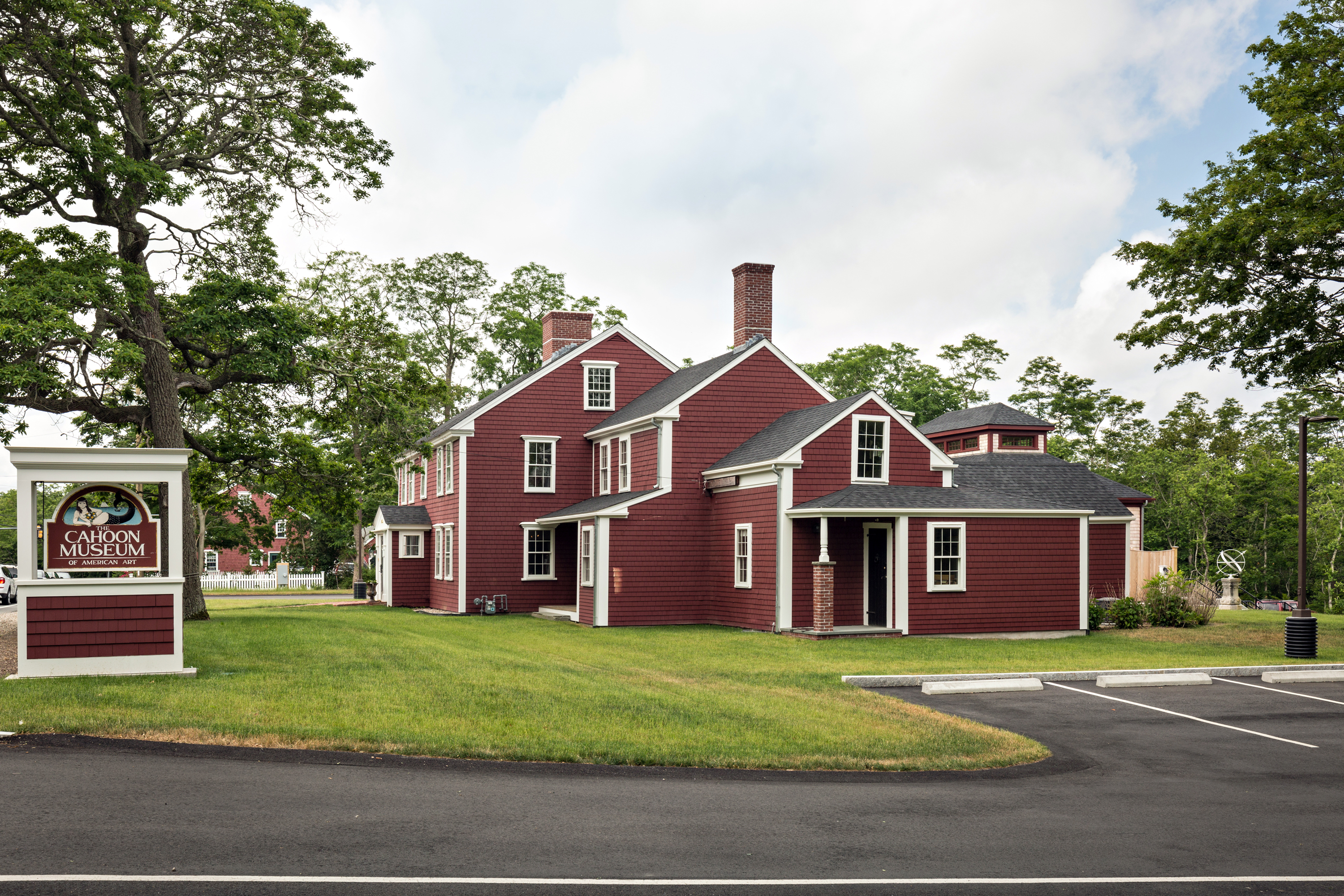
Cahoon Museum

The Cahoon Museum of American Art is an art museum located in Cotuit, Massachusetts. It features fine art, folk art and American art from the 1800s through the present. Public programs include a series of annual changing exhibitions, tours, artist's talks and workshops, and family activities.

== History ==
The Museum's historical building was completed between 1775–1782 by Zenas Crocker. Through its years it has been used as a home, a tavern, an art studio/ gallery, and renovated back into home. It is one of six Crocker homes situated off RTE 28 in present day Cotuit, Massachusetts.

The museum was founded in 1982 by Cotuit art collector, Rosemary Rapp.

In 1945, artists Ralph Cahoon and Martha A Farham Cahoon bought the house, and used the lower level of their home as their gallery and studio . The couple had one child in 1935 whom they named Franz.

The Cahoons rose in popularity in the 1950s and credited their fame to Joan Whitney Payson, an American heiress, businesswomen, philanthropist, founding MLB team owner of the New York Mets and art collector.

In 1982 Rosemary Rapp bought the property located at 4676 Falmouth Road, Cotuit Ma. In 1986 the Cahoon Museum was opened.

The museum was extensively expanded and renovated in 2014–2015. The museum reopened in May 2016.

== Collection ==
The museum hosts an array of exhibitions each year including contemporary artists, as well as historical exhibits.

The museum's collection of art continues to grow through donation and purchase. The collection includes work by Cape Cod folk artists Ralph Cahoon and Martha Cahoon, 19th century paintings by Ralph Blakelock, William Bradford, James Buttersworth, John J. Enneking, Alvan Fisher, Levi Wells Prentice and William Matthew Prior, 20th century paintings by Margaret Patterson, Daisy Hughes, Scott Prior and multiple contemporary artists.
