= Julian Codman =

American lawyer (1870–1932)

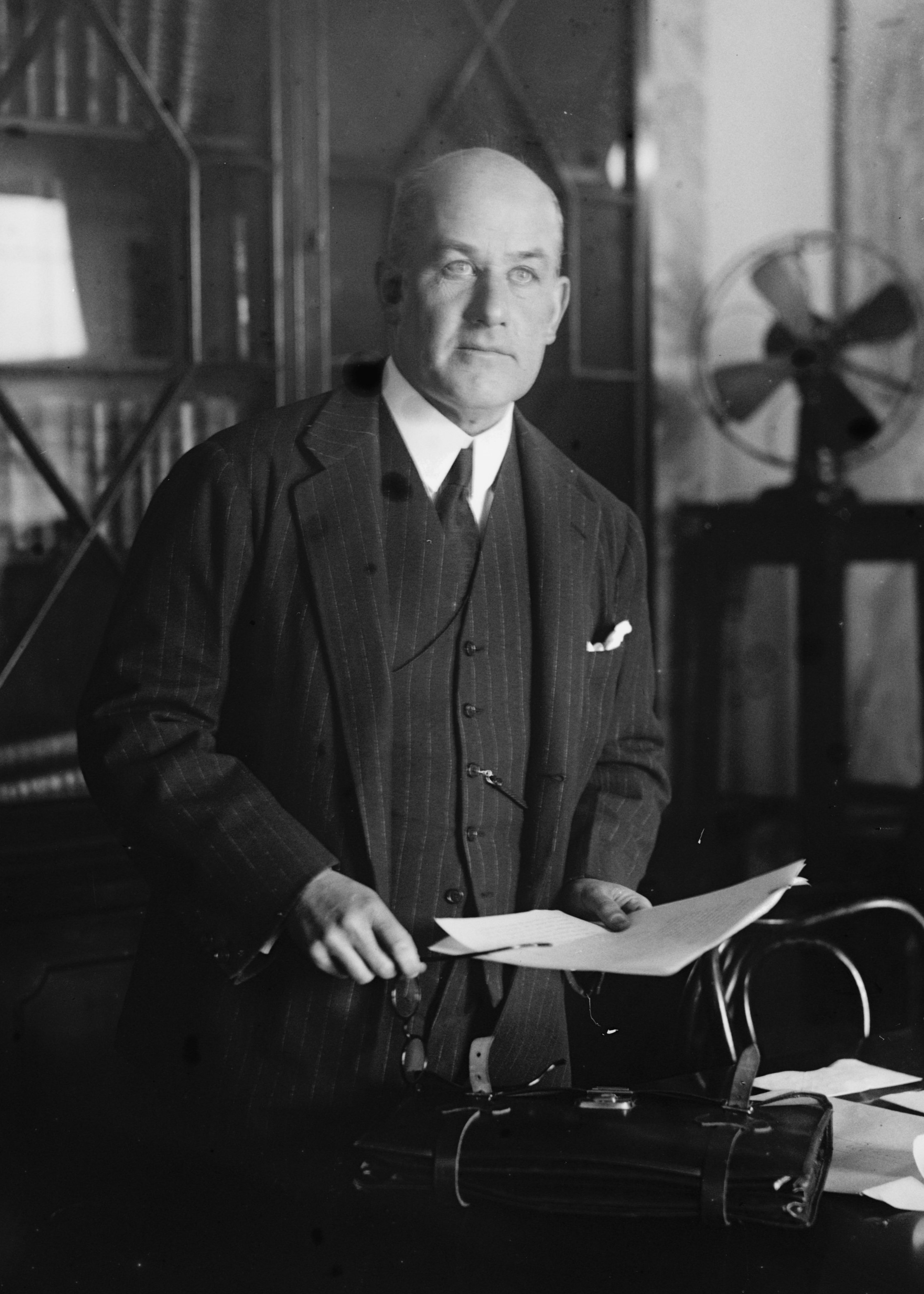
- Born: September 21, 1870; Cotuit, Massachusetts
- Died: December 30, 1932 (aged 62); Boston, Massachusetts
- Burial place: Forest Hills Cemetery
- Education: Harvard University, A.B. (1892); Harvard Law School, LL.B. (1895)
- Occupation: Lawyer
- Father: Charles R. Codman
- Family: Russell Sturgis (grandfather); John Hubbard Sturgis (uncle); James Read Chadwick (father-in-law)

Julian Codman (September 21, 1870 – December 30, 1932), was an American lawyer who was a vigorous opponent of Prohibition who was also involved with the Anti-Imperialist League.

== Early life ==
Codman was born in Cotuit, Massachusetts, on September 21, 1870. He was the son of Col. Charles Russell Codman (1829–1918), a colonel in the Union Army who commanded the 45th Massachusetts Volunteer Infantry, and Lucy Lyman Paine Sturgis (1833–1907). Among his siblings were Russell Sturgis Codman; John Sturgis Codman; Anne McMasters Codman, who married Henry Bromfield Cabot; and Susan Welles Codman, who married Redington Fiske.

His maternal grandfather was Russell Sturgis, a wealthy Boston merchant active in the China trade, and his uncle was noted architect and builder John Hubbard Sturgis, who designed the Codman House in Lincoln, Massachusetts and the Boston Museum of Fine Arts, along with Charles Brigham.

Codman received an A.B. degree from Harvard University in 1892 and an LL.B. degree from Harvard Law School in 1895. He passed the Massachusetts Bar exam in 1895 and began practicing as a lawyer.

== Career ==
Codman, an Independent, was a member of the Executive Committee of New England Anti-Imperialist League from 1902 to 1904. In 1904, he was a Delegate of the Democratic National Convention, a Signatory of Philippine Independence Committee Petition, and sat on the Executive Committee of Anti-Imperialist League. In 1918, he was the vice-president of Anti-Imperialist League.

From 1916 until 1919, Codman served in the U.S. Army during World War I, achieving the rank of Colonel.

He also served as a vice-president of the Associated Charities, headed the Constitutional Liberty League, was counsel for the Joint Legislative Committee, and was a notable foe of prohibition. He twice represented the combined anti-Prohibition societies at Congressional hearings.

Codman co-wrote Secretary Root's Record: "Marked Severities" in Philippine Warfare.

== Personal life ==
In 1897, he married Norah Chadwick (1873–1961), daughter of James Read Chadwick and his wife Katherine Maria Lyman. They had two daughters, who were the wives of Guy Holden Norris and Ransom F. Hodges.

Codman died at the Massachusetts General Hospital in Boston on December 30, 1932, and was buried at Forest Hills Cemetery, which is located in the Forest Hills section of the Jamaica Plain neighborhood of Boston, Massachusetts.
