= Sampsons Island =

Uninhabited island off the coast of Massachusetts, United States

Coordinates: 41°36′28.2″N 70°25′33.9″W

Sampsons Island is a 15-acre (6.1 ha) uninhabited, undeveloped barrier island at the mouth of Cotuit Harbor in Barnstable, Massachusetts. It is the location of the Massachusetts Audubon Society's Sampsons Island Wildlife Sanctuary, and it forms part of the Sampsons Island/Dead Neck Island barrier beach system. The island is only accessible by private boat, and is used for recreation and wildlife viewing and preservation.

As a barrier island, Sampsons Island and Dead Neck Island protect Cotuit Harbor and nearby coastal areas. The island is a nesting site for piping plovers, least terns, and common terns and a habitat for many other shore birds. It is designated an Important Bird Area. Access to the island is limited during nesting season.
