= Col. Charles Codman Estate =

Historic house in Massachusetts, United States

- U.S. National Register of Historic Places
- U.S. Historic district – Contributing property
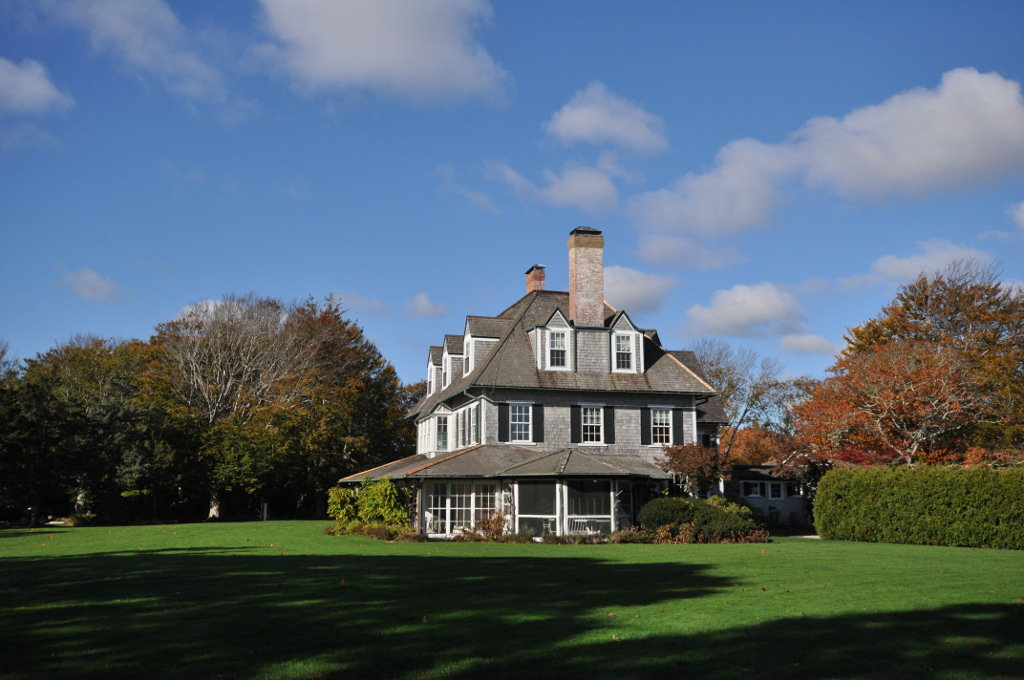

- Location within Cape Cod Location within Massachusetts Location within the United States
- Location: Bluff Point Dr., Barnstable, Massachusetts
- Coordinates: 41°36′41″N 70°25′58″W
- Area: 3.39 acres (1.37 ha)
- Built: 1870
- Architect: Sturgis, John R.
- Architectural style: Queen Anne, Shingle Style
- Part of: Cotuit Historic District (ID87000317)
- MPS: Barnstable MRA
- NRHP reference No.: 87000321

Significant dates
- Added to NRHP: March 13, 1987
- Designated CP: November 10, 1987

The Col. Charles Codman Estate is a historic house on Bluff Point Drive in Barnstable, Massachusetts. Built in 1870, the house is a well-preserved example of a summer seaside resort house in Queen Anne/Shingle style. It was designed by Boston architect John Sturgis, and modified in the early 20th century, adding some Colonial Revival elements. The estate was listed on the National Register of Historic Places in March 1987, and it was included in the Cotuit Historic District in November 1987.

== Description and history ==
The Codman House is set near the end of Bluff Point Drive, a semi-private spur road off Ocean View Drive just south of its junction with Main Street in Cotuit. It is set on the south side of the road, shortly before the circle at the end of the road. It is a large L-shaped 2 1/2-story wood-frame structure, with hipped and gabled roof, and shingle siding. The short leg of the L projects forward from the right side of the north-facing main facade, and the entrance is near the crook of the L on the long side, which is five bays wide. The two left first-floor bays project, covered by a metal hip roof. Gable-roof dormers pierce the roof on several elevations, some of which have been joined to enlarge the interior space. A single-story porch wraps around the eastern and southern sides, with a bowed projection.

The house was built in 1870 by Colonel Charles R. Codman, an American Civil War veteran who had been summering in the area for twenty years prior to purchasing the property. Designed by Boston architect John Sturgis, the house originally had Queen Anne styling that included bands of decoratively cut shingles and jerkin-headed dormers with bargeboard trim. A later owner removed these features and added others, including the dormer extensions, giving the house a more Colonial Revival feeling.

== See also ==
- National Register of Historic Places listings in Barnstable County, Massachusetts
