= Cotuit Historic District =

Historic district in Massachusetts, United States

- U.S. National Register of Historic Places
- U.S. Historic district
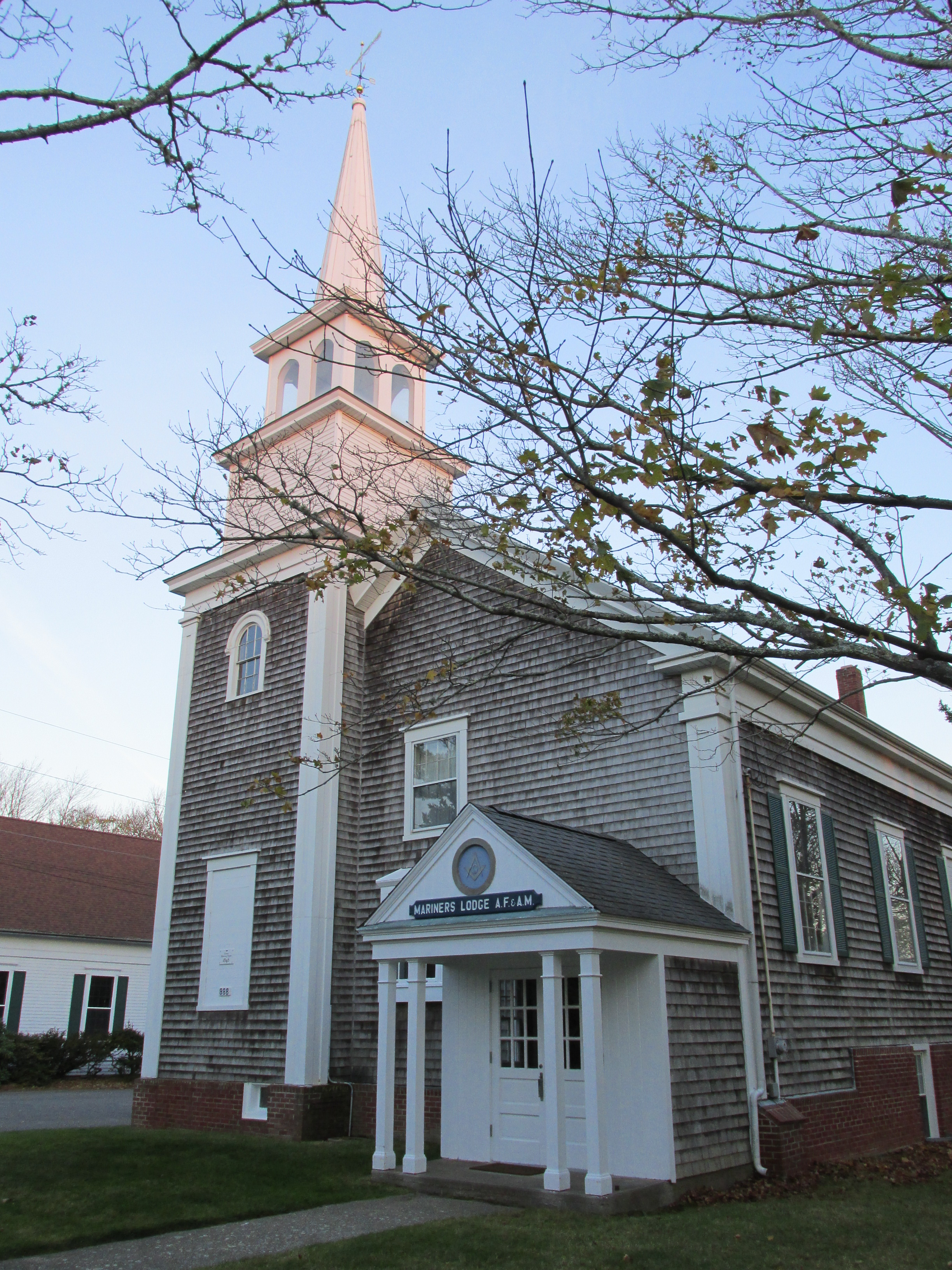
- 1846 Union Meeting House

- Location within Cape Cod Location within Massachusetts Location within the United States
- Location: Barnstable, Massachusetts
- Coordinates: 41°36′57″N 70°26′14″W
- Architectural style: Greek Revival, Late Victorian, Federal
- MPS: Barnstable MRA
- NRHP reference No.: 87000317
- Added to NRHP: November 10, 1987

The Cotuit Historic District is a historic district encompassing the heart of the village of Cotuit in Barnstable, Massachusetts. It extends along Main Street from Lowell Street in the north to Sea Street in the south, and includes portions of Ocean View Avenue and properties on adjacent roads. The oldest properties date to the late 18th century (including the c. 1790 Samuel Dottridge House, now a local historical society museum), but saw its greatest development during the height of the area's maritime industry in the mid 19th century. In the late 19th and early 20th century the area saw new development as a summer resort area. The district was listed on the National Register of Historic Places in 1987.

== History ==
Cotuit is located in southwestern Barnstable, on a peninsula bounded on the west by the Santuit River and on the east by Cotuit Bay. The central village of Cotuit is on the northeastern part of this peninsula, extending north and south along Main Street from its junction with School Street. The district includes about 125 mainly residential properties, with most construction dates falling between about 1850 and 1920. The area was first settled in the late 18th century as an agricultural area, and did not achieve prominence as a maritime center until the 19th century. Large-scale sea-faring activities generally raised maritime activities on the south coast of Cape Cod, and Cotuit became home to a number of sea captains and maritime businesses by the mid-19th century. This resulted in the construction of a significant number of fine Greek Revival and Italianate houses that line Main Street.

In the late 19th century the area saw a rise in the construction of summer homes, albeit on a restrained scale. These homes filled in areas around the older homes, and are predominantly Queen Anne in style, although the district includes several Colonial Revival houses. The Cotuit Library, built about 1910 on Main Street, is the district's only significant Classical Revival building.

== See also ==
- National Register of Historic Places listings in Barnstable County, Massachusetts
