= 1878 Boston mayoral election =

Election in Massachusetts, United States

- December 10, 1878
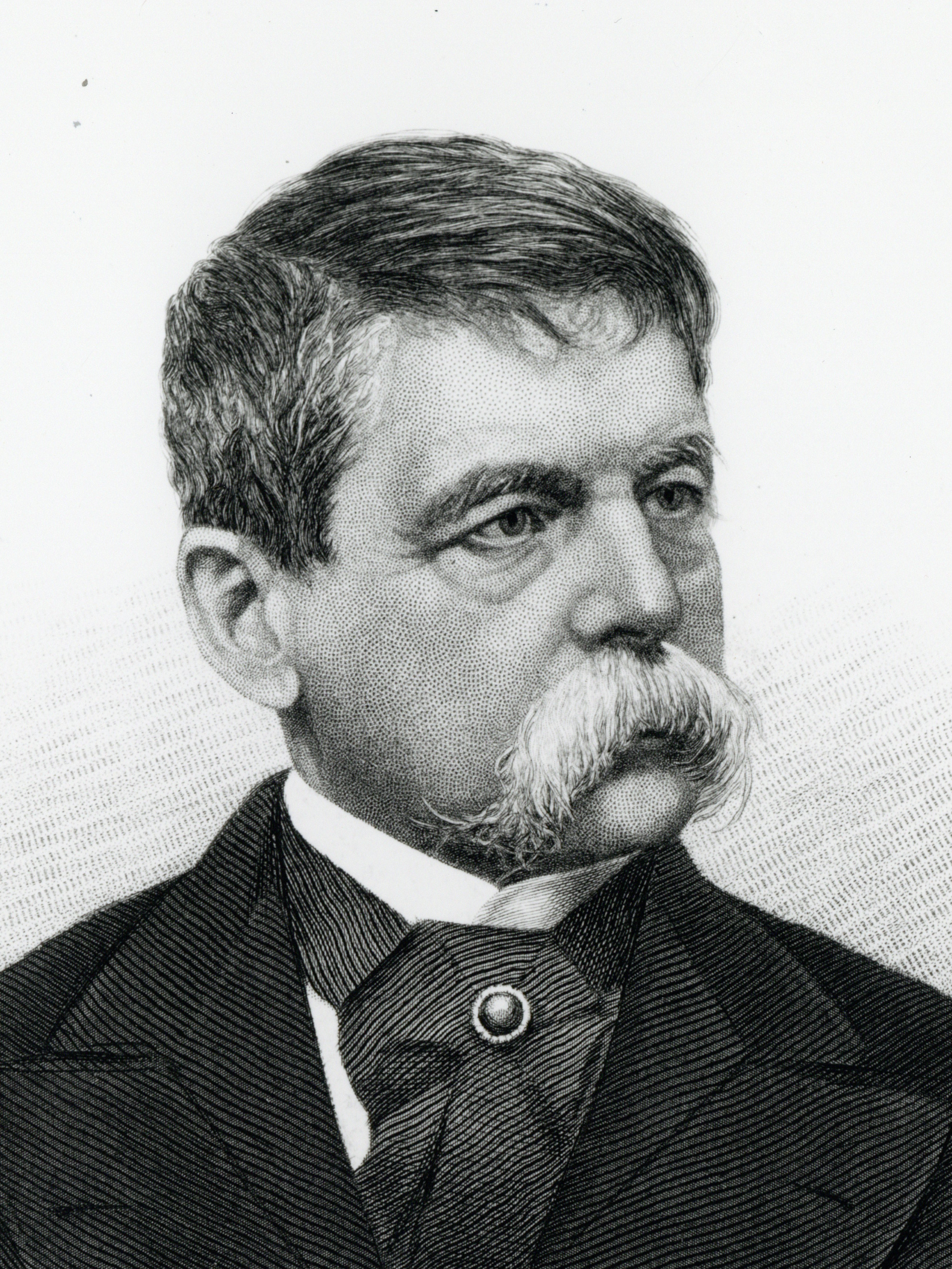

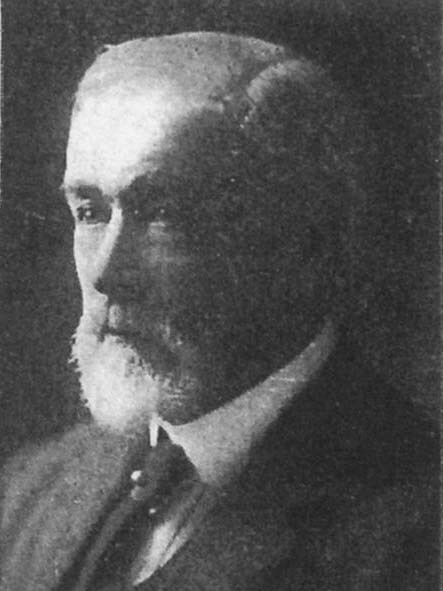
Candidate	Frederick O. Prince	Charles R. Codman
Party	Democratic	Republican
Popular vote	19,676	18,003
Percentage	51.59%	47.20%
Mayor before election
Henry L. Pierce
Republican
Elected mayor
Frederick O. Prince
Democratic

The Boston mayoral election of 1878 saw Democratic Frederick O. Prince elected to return to the mayoralty for a second nonconsecutive term. He defeated Republican nominee Charles R. Codman and Greenback contender Davis J. King.

== Nominations ==
The city's Republicans nominated Charles R. Codman for mayor on a "Citizens'" ticket at a convention held on November 30.

The city's Democrats formally nominated former mayor Frederick O. Prince on November 11, 1878.

The Labor Reform Party and Workingman's Party (Greenbacks) formally nominated Davis J. King on December 6, 1878. However, many Boston supporters of leading Greenback politician Benjamin Butler instead supported Prince's candidacy.

== Results ==
1878 Boston mayoral election
Party	Candidate	Votes	%
Democratic	Frederick O. Prince	19,676	51.59
Republican	Charles R. Codman	18,003	47.20
Greenback	Davis J. King	440	1.15
Others	Scattering	22	0.06
Turnout		38,141	

== See also ==
- List of mayors of Boston, Massachusetts
