= Cotuit, Massachusetts =

- Village
- Location of ZIP code 02635 Cotuit within the Town of Barnstable, county, and state
- Coordinates: 41°37′00″N 70°26′13″W
- Country: United States
- State: Massachusetts
- County: Barnstable
- Town: Barnstable

Area
  - Total: 6.60 sq mi (17.10 km^{2})
  - Land: 5.50 sq mi (14.25 km^{2})
  - Water: 1.10 sq mi (2.85 km^{2})

Population (1995 estimate)
  - Total: 3,296
  - Density: 599.3/sq mi (231.38/km^{2})
- Time zone: UTC-5 (Eastern (EST))
  - Summer (DST): UTC-4 (EDT)

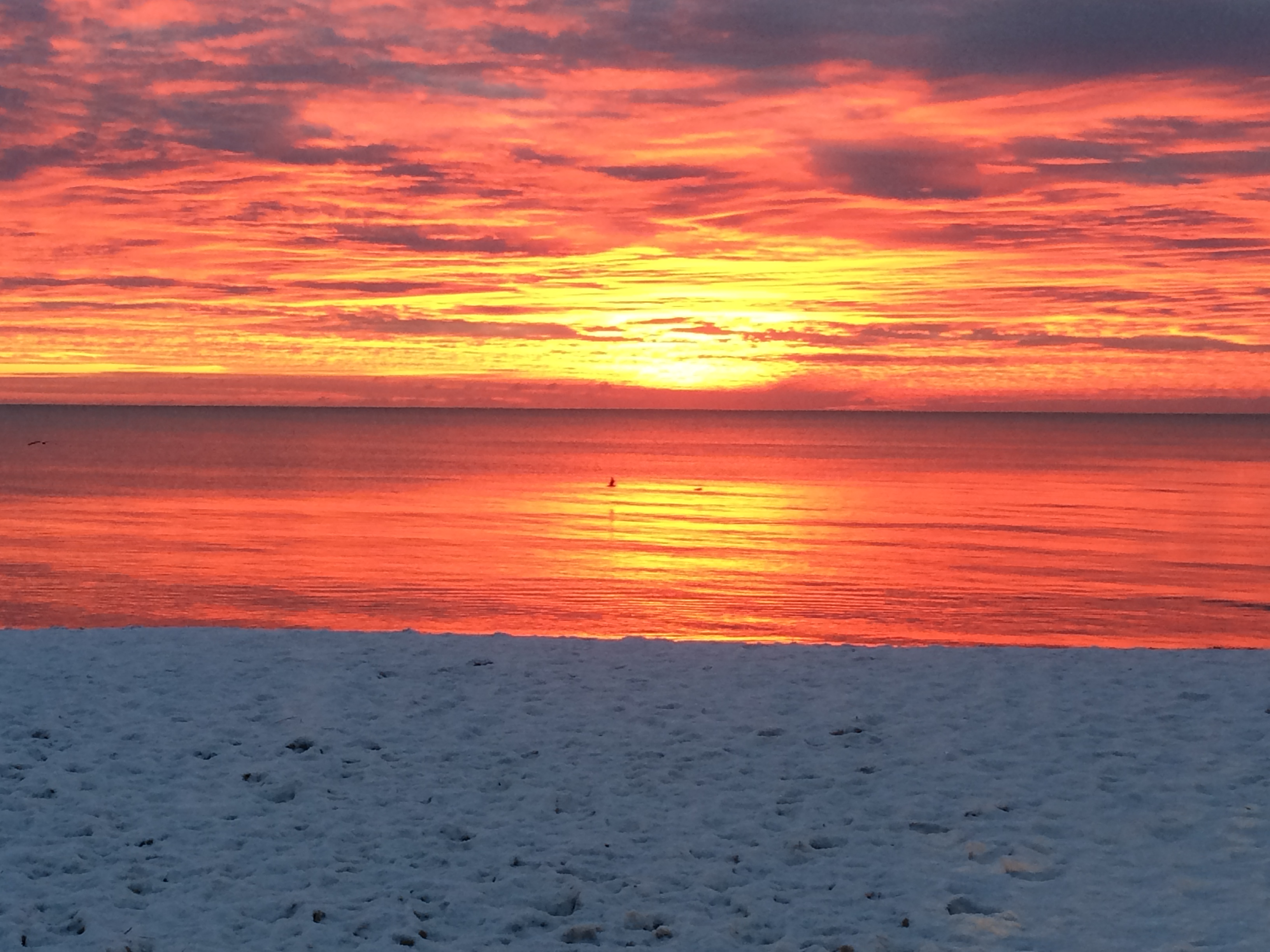
Sunrise at Loop's Beach

Cotuit (/kəˈtuɪt/ kə-TOO-it) is one of the villages of the Town of Barnstable on Cape Cod in Barnstable County, Massachusetts, United States. Located on a peninsula on the south side of Barnstable about midway between Falmouth and Hyannis, Cotuit is bounded by the Santuit River to the west on the Mashpee town line, the villages of Marstons Mills to the north and Osterville to the east, and Nantucket Sound to the south. Cotuit is primarily residential with several small beaches including Ropes Beach, Riley's Beach, The Loop Beach and Oregon Beach.

== History ==
=== Colonial era ===
Cotuit was part of a major land purchase negotiated by Myles Standish of the Plymouth Colony with Paupmunnuck, Wampanoag headman of the Cotachessett village allegedly located on or near the island known today as Oyster Harbors, or Grand Island. That transaction, which occurred on May 17, 1648, was made by Paupmunnuck and his brother, and "sold" about "twenty square miles of land in what is now the southwestern section of Barnstable."

The purchase price was two kettles, a bushel of Indian corn, and the agreement to fence off 30 acres (120,000 m^{2}) of land comprising the Cotachessett village. However this was renegotiated shortly after the conclusion of the Standish agreement to drop the fence and corn and settled instead on a price of "one great brass kettle seven spans in wideness round about, and one broad hoe."

Cattle and the harvesting of salt marsh hay was the primary economic activity in colonial Cotuit. The Little River section of the village (near the present location of the Cotuit Oyster Company) was the site of some early shipyards.

The name Cotuit is derived from the Wampanoag term: "place of the council". Cotuit was formerly known as Cotuit Port until the postmaster, Charles C. Bearse, dropped the "port" in 1872.

Built circa 1793, just off Main Street near the center of the village, is the Sampson's Folly-Josiah Sampson House, the oldest standing home actually built in Cotuit (the Crocker House on Route 28 was built in 1749 in the village of West Barnstable and then moved to its present location in Cotuit by oxen). When this Federal-style New England house was built by English businessman Josiah Sampson, it was regarded as so extravagant for its day that it came to be known by the townspeople as "Sampson's Folly", faced with many windows and containing a ballroom for dancing on its second floor. Now listed as "Sampson's Folly" on the National Register of Historic Places, this home once operated as a bed and breakfast but is now a private residence. The property contained a working farm and a mill on the Santuit River, lending its name to the road which ran nearby, Sampson's Mill Road.

A list of Cotuit families with some genealogical information has been compiled by local historian James Gould.

The Cotuit Historic District was listed on the National Register of Historic Places in 1987.

=== Modern era ===
In the early 20th century, Cotuit saw more commercial activity, including hotels such as The Pines, one of Cape Cod's earliest summer resorts. During World War II, Cotuit was home to Camp Candoit. During the 1970s there was a large restaurant called The Harbor View, located at 968 Main Street, which has been turned into a private residence. The Cotuit Inn was demolished in 1986, and condominiums were built in its place. In 1987 the Cotuit Historic District was added to the National Register of Historic Places.

== Geography ==
The latitude of Cotuit is 41.61667. The longitude is -70.4375. According to the 1995 Town of Barnstable Comprehensive Plans, Cotuit is among the smallest of the town's seven villages, having a total area of roughly 5 square miles (13 km^{2}). The major part of the village is bounded on three sides by water. Although Cotuit has 12 miles (19 km) of coastline, comparable in length to its 10 miles (16 km) of scenic roadways, the 8 town-owned beaches, landings and ways to the water in the village combine to occupy only 3.16 acres (12,800 m^{2}).

=== Central Village ===
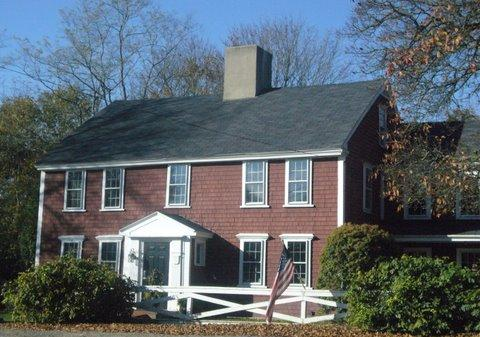
Cahoon Museum of American Art

The commercial zone is small, with only a few businesses located in the center of the village: a small restaurant and bar called The Kettle-Ho (named after the legend of how the town was acquired from the native Wampanoags for a kettle and a hoe, see above), a post office (02635), a Federated church (United Church of Christ/United Methodist Church), a non-profit nursery school, several real estate offices, an insurance office, an architect's office and the Cotuit Public Library. To the north on Main Street is a small variety store and a grocery store. Other Cotuit businesses are located along Route 28 in the Santuit-Newtown area of the town, also the location of the Cotuit Center for the Arts and the Cahoon Museum of American Art.

The Cahoon Museum of American Art is located at the former home of Martha and Ralph Cahoon, who were prominent American painters.

A few steps from the village green is the historic Freedom Hall, currently used for various civic gatherings and elections, and Mariners' Hall, currently a Masonic Lodge. A little further down Main Street is the Museum of the Historical Society of Cotuit and Santuit, which includes the Samuel B. Dottridge Homestead, a representation of coastal life in Cotuit in the first half of the 19th century.

=== Santuit ===
The northwestern corner of Cotuit is referred to as Santuit and represents a distinct sub-village within Cotuit, marking the intersection of Main Street, Route 28 and Route 130. It is the westernmost village in the town of Barnstable and is the location of several historically significant buildings, including the Crocker House (formerly site of the Regatta Restaurant which closed in 2012), the Cahoon Museum of Art, and other colonial-era houses. The former Santuit Post Office still stands on Main Street but is now part of a private residence, though it retains the post office boxes used by Santuit residents. The former home of the EPAC Grotto of Masons is now the site of St. Michael the Archangel Antiochian Orthodox church.

=== Cotuit Bay ===
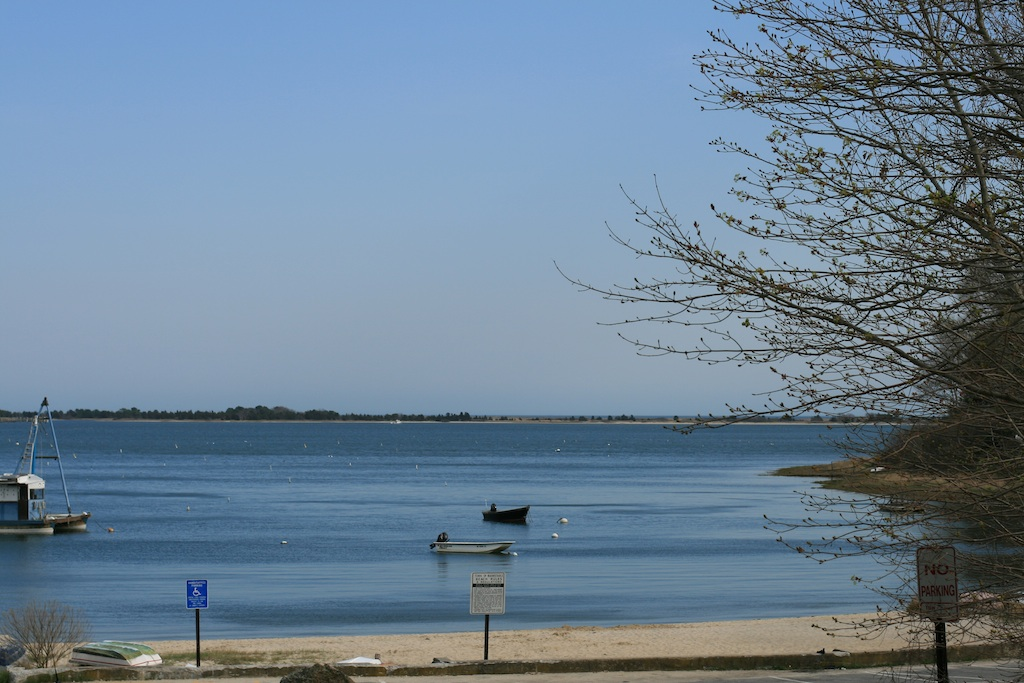
Rope's Beach looking out onto Cotuit Bay in April 2008

Cotuit Bay, the main body of water in town, is bounded by Cotuit to the west, Grand Island/Oyster Harbors to the east (part of the village of Osterville) and Dead Neck/Sampson's Island to the south, making the bay a quiet harbor and part of the so-called Three Bays system which includes North and West Bays. Sampson's Island is an Audubon bird sanctuary, jointly managed by the Three Bays Preservation organization, that can only be reached by boat. A permit is required for visitors. The bay is shallow and busy with boat traffic during the summer months. It is the site of the Cotuit Oyster Company.

There are no commercial marine facilities in Cotuit Bay. The nearest source of fuel (diesel and gasoline) is in Osterville to the east. A number of local boatyards, including the renowned Pecks' Boatyard founded by Captain Leonard Peck, service boats in the harbor, but there is no commercial marina in the bay or inner harbor. A private launch service runs from the town dock from May through October, charging a small fee for trips to the mooring field (hail on VHF Channel 68). A free pump-out service for marine heads (toilets) is provided by the town harbormaster (available by hailing on radio or phoning 508-790-6273, facility also located at Crosby Yacht Yard in Osterville). Ice and groceries for visiting boaters is available ashore at the Cotuit Grocery Store on Main Street.

A concrete boat ramp for small boats is located at Old Shore Road near Ropes Beach. Car and trailer parking is permitted only with a Town of Barnstable beach parking sticker, available to residents from the town's recreation department.

There are several public ways to water, including Cordwood Landing off Old Post Road, Ropes Beach, Town Dock, Riley's Beach, Loop Beach, and Oregon Way to Water. Other public paths exist and are catalogued by the Barnstable Association of Recreational Shellfishermen.

Mooring is regulated by the Town of Barnstable.

== Government ==
Cotuit is one of seven villages in the Town of Barnstable in Barnstable County. It is represented on the Barnstable Town Council by a Precinct 7 Town Councilor elected every four years. The Cotuit Fire District was incorporated by an act of the Massachusetts General Court in 1926 which grants the district the authority to establish public safety services, including a fire department and rescue personnel; a water department to provide the village with drinking water; and a Prudential Committee to oversee the budgets and infrastructure of the district. There are ten elected officials: a Moderator; three members of the Prudential Committee; three members of the Board of Water Commissioners; and three members of the Board of Fire Commissioners. Each elected official serves a three-year term. An annual district meeting is convened on the last Wednesday of May, preceded by the annual elections where one member of the Prudential, Fire and Water boards is elected by ballot.

== Demographics ==
According to the 1995 Town of Barnstable Comprehensive plans, Cotuit, one of the less densely populated of the villages, has a year-round population of roughly 2,600, with an additional 1,600 summer residents.

== Cotuit Oysters ==
=== Cotuit Oysters ===
Cotuit Oysters are a distinct version of the eastern oyster species, unique to Cotuit Bay and remarkable for their flavor. Wild oysters are making a gradual comeback along some shores.

=== Cotuit Oyster Company ===
The Cotuit Oyster Company dates back to 1837 and is still cultivating the distinctive Cotuit Oysters with their unique flavor, producing the oldest brand name of oyster in the United States. Cotuit is world-famous for its oysters, and in years past they rivaled Wellfleet oysters and could be found on menus in restaurants from San Francisco to Paris. In the 1980s, however, many of the Cotuit oyster beds were significantly diminished. Today, Cotuit Oysters are re-appearing on the menus of many fine-dining establishments on Cape Cod and in Boston, and the world-famous Oyster Bar Restaurant in Grand Central Terminal in New York City.

== Recreation ==
=== Cotuit Skiffs ===
Cotuit Skiffs, formerly known as Cotuit Mosquitos, are 14-foot (4.3 m) gaff-rigged "one-design" sailboats that have been sailed on the waters of Cotuit Bay for the last 104 years, making them one of the oldest continuously sailed fleets of one-design racing boats in the world.

They were designed by Stanley Butler after the turn of the 20th century and were modeled after the flat-bottomed skiffs used in the oyster and commercial clam trade. Those boats were built with hard chines and low gunwales to provide a stable platform from which to clam from. The design was altered many times until 1926 when the design was standardized.

Cotuit Skiffs are rigged like classic Cape Cod catboats—that is they carry only a gaff-rigged mainsail, no jib, and their masts are stepped in the very bow of the boat. They carry a considerable amount of sail and are considered an extremely challenging boat to sail, especially in a brisk breeze. They are fitted with a centerboard and are generally raced by one or two people, with three carried only in high winds. The huge mainsail and its boom overhang the hull's transom by four feet.

Since 1906 the Cotuit Mosquito Yacht Club (CMYC) has hosted races during the summer months. Although the yacht club has had more than one fleet—juniors compete in inter-club regatta in 420s - the gaff-rigged skiff has been raced for slightly over the 100 years that the yacht club has existed. The CMYC is supported by the Association of the Cotuit Mosquito Yacht Club, a non-profit organization that manages a sailing instructional program for children between 8 and 18 years of age.

CMYC historian Larry Odence published a comprehensive history of the Cotuit Skiff in 2009: Mosquito Boats: The First Hundred Years of the Cotuit Skiff, which was published in a limited edition, but available for loan from the Cotuit Library.

=== Cotuit Kettleers and the Cape Cod Baseball League ===
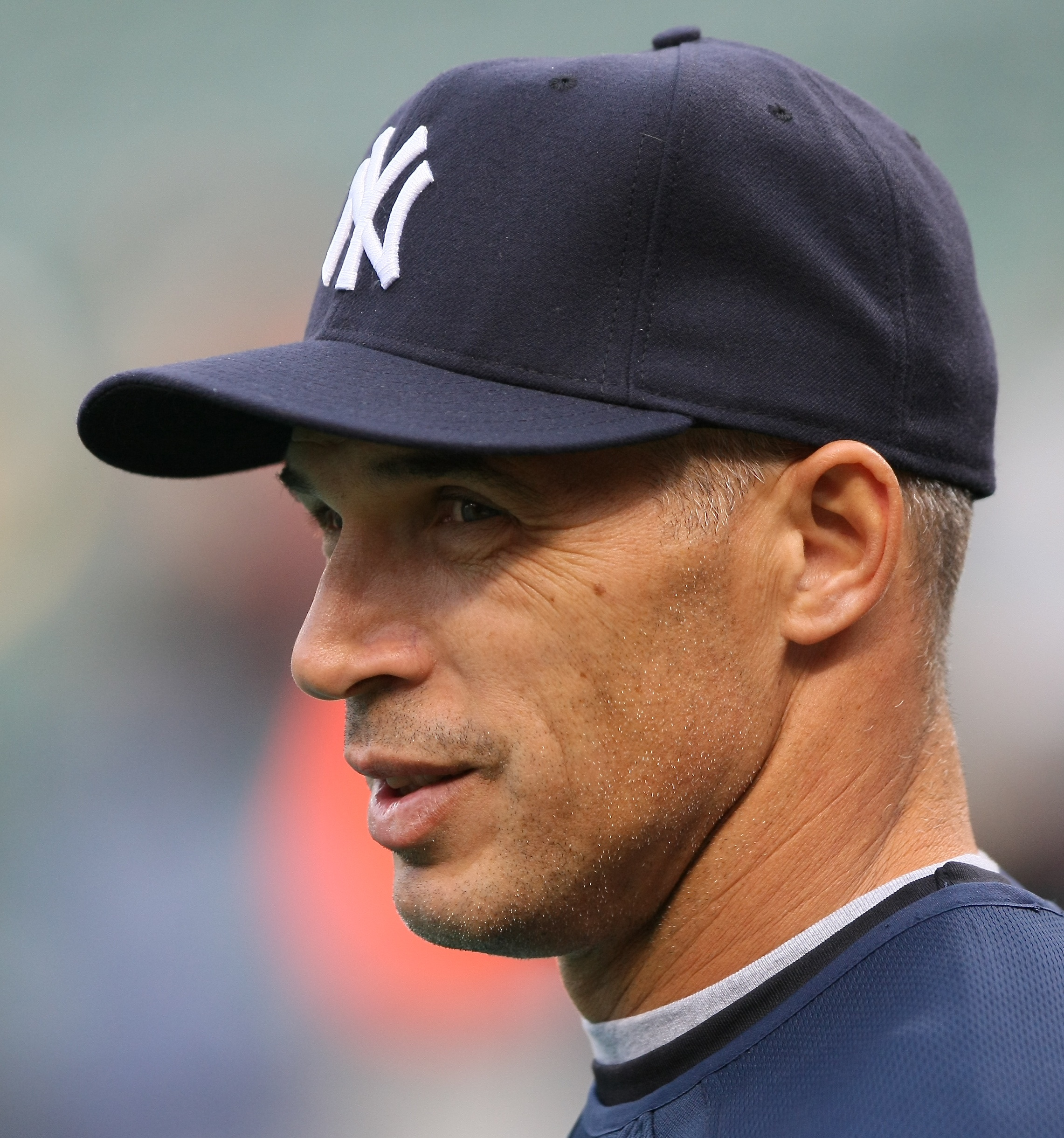
Joe Girardi played for the Cotuit Kettleers in 1984.

The Cotuit Kettleers is an amateur collegiate summer baseball team in the Cape Cod Baseball League. The team plays its home games at Lowell Park, and has been supported by the Cotuit Athletic Association since 1947. Currently managed by Rob Cooper, the Kettleers have won more Cape League titles than any team in league history, and have featured dozens of players who went on to careers in Major League Baseball, such as Will Clark, Joe Girardi, and Chase Utley.

== Notable people ==
- Otis Barton, pioneer in deep water exploration
- Jacques Barzun, academic, critic, author
- Matthew Barzun, U.S. ambassador to the United Kingdom, 2013-2016
- William Beebe, pioneer in deep water exploration
- Stanley Cobb, neurologist and "founder of biological psychiatry" in the United States
- Lucy Barzun Donnelly, producer "Grey Gardens"
- Erik Erikson, developmental psychologist and psychoanalyst
- Kai T. Erikson, Yale professor, sociologist
- Foster Furcolo, 60th Governor of Massachusetts
- Charles L. Gifford, U.S. Congressman
- Mark Antony De Wolfe Howe, editor of the Atlantic Monthly, Pulitzer Prize winner
- Quincy Howe, American radio journalist
- Abbott Lawrence Lowell, President of Harvard College 1909–1932
- Edward Jackson Lowell, historian
- Francis Cabot Lowell, United States Federal Judge
- Jim Manzi, former Chairman, President, CEO Lotus Development Corp.
- Frank McCourt, former owner Los Angeles Dodgers
- Dempster McIntosh, businessman and diplomat
- James Jackson Putnam, neurologist and founding member of the American Neurological Association
- Patrick Robinson, author
- Dr. Helen B. Taussig, cardiac pediatrician, noted for “blue baby” research
