= Martha Cahoon =

American artist (1905–1999)

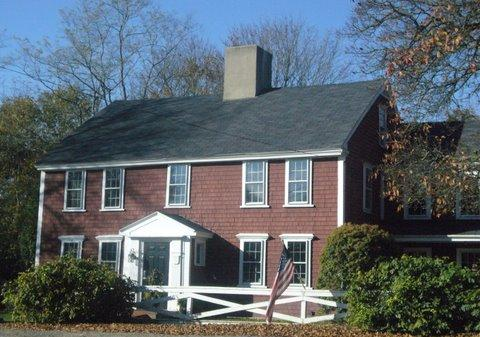
Cahoon Museum in Cotuit, Massachusetts

Martha Cahoon (Jan. 11, 1905 – Dec. 7, 1999) was an American artist. She was the wife and business partner of artist, Ralph Eugene Cahoon, Jr.

== Early life ==
Martha Farham was born in Boston's Roslindale neighborhood to Swedish immigrant parents, Axel Farham (1876-1946) and Elma (Ericson) Farham (1875-1956). She lived there until her family re-located to the seaside town of Harwich, Massachusetts in Cape Cod in 1915.

== Education ==
Although by all accounts Martha was an excellent student she declined to attend college after her high school graduation, instead choosing to become a full-time apprentice to her father, who was a respected furniture decorator. Working under her father she quickly mastered the restoration and decoration of antique furniture and started to gain her own reputation as an adept craftswoman.

== Marriage ==
In 1930 Martha Farham met Ralph Cahoon and, although she was five years his senior, they started a lifelong romance. In 1932 they were married by a justice of the peace and soon moved a few towns away to Osterville. As they started their lives together, Martha taught Ralph her family's business and soon they had their own thriving business refinishing, decorating, and selling antique furniture. They would soon outgrow their Osterville home and re-locate to a house in Cotuit that provided them ample space to grow their business.

== Art career ==
In 1953 their careers took a new path when one of their customers, the wealthy New York socialite, art dealer, and future co-owner of the New York Mets, Joan Whitney Payson convinced them to frame some of their designs. Furthermore, Payson offered to show their works in her Long Island Gallery. Their foray from furniture decoration into "wall art" proved successful and both Cahoons went on to produce numerous works over the ensuing decades.

While much of their earlier furniture decoration shared the same Pennsylvania Dutch inspired motifs, their easel paintings marked the first significant diversion in Ralph and Martha's palettes and styles. While Martha continued to work in muted tones and 19th century naive styles, Ralph experimented with brighter and more contrasting colors, and developed his signature style of frolicking mermaids and sailors set against fantasized New England settings. Although Martha did adopt portions of her husband's style her work remained softer and less playful, focusing more on idyllic and soothing subjects.

== Later years ==
Martha Cahoon continued painting long after her husband's death in 1982 and continued to draw in crayon up until her death in 1999. Her works are considered to be masterpieces of 20th century American folk art and are housed in many museums and countless private collections including Cahoon Museum of American Art.

== Other sources ==
- Bollerud, Erica; Julia Clinger (2007) Insiders' Guide to Cape Cod and the Islands (Globe Pequot) ISBN 978-0762744022
- Falk, Peter (1985) Who Was Who in American Art (Sound View Press) ISBN 978-0932087003
- Zellman, Michael David (1988) 300 Years of American Art (Book Sales) ISBN 978-1555211721
