= Lowell Park (ballpark) =

Baseball venue in Cotuit, Massachusetts

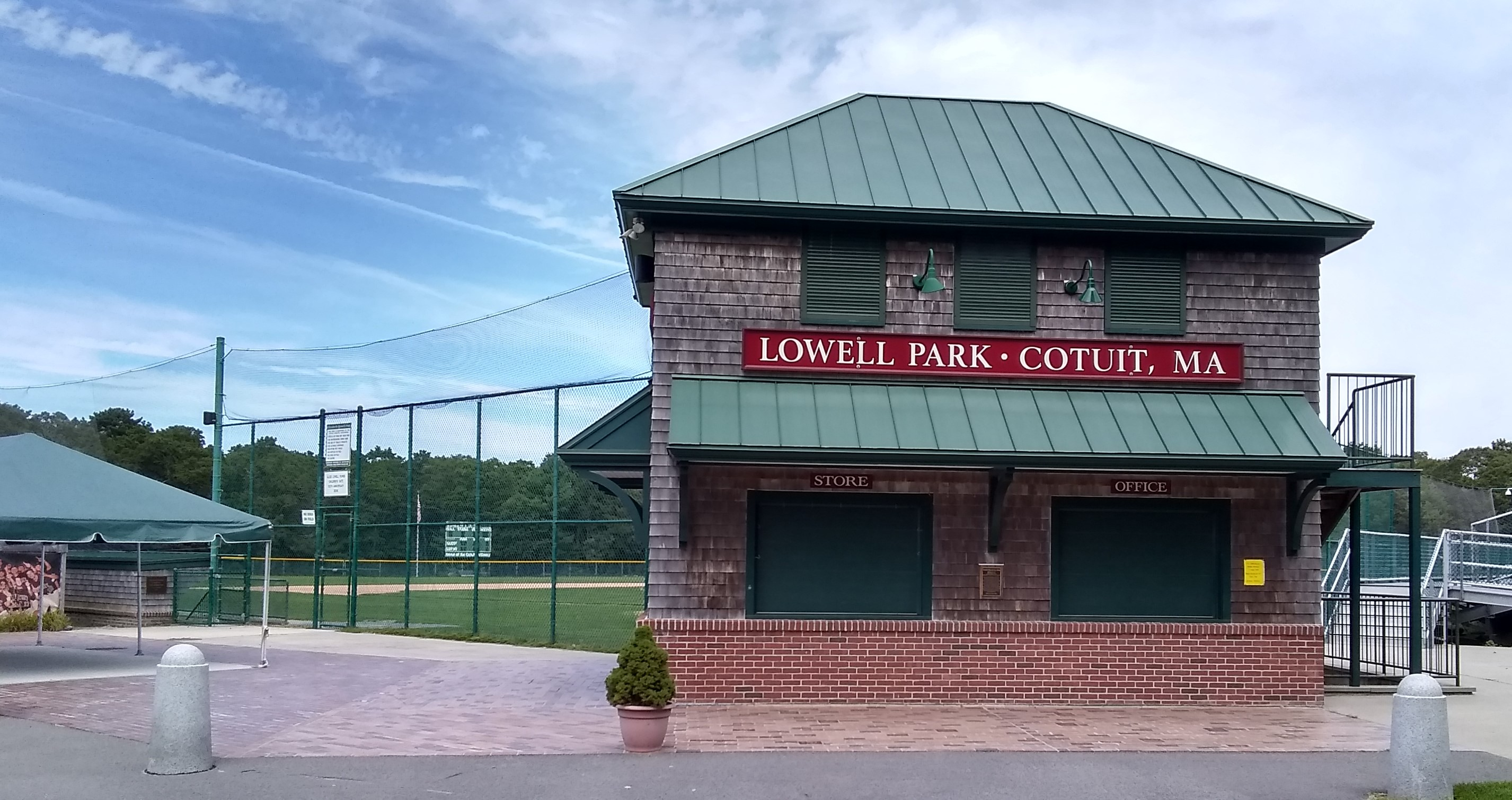
- Interactive map of Lowell Park
- Full name: Elizabeth Lowell Park
- Address: 10 Lowell Street
- Location: Cotuit, Massachusetts
- Coordinates: 41°37′30.75″N 70°26′5.53″W
- Capacity: 2,500
- Surface: Grass
- Field size: Left Field: 320 ft Center Field: 399 ft Right Field: 320 ft

Construction
- Opened: 1947

Tenant
- Cotuit Kettleers

Elizabeth Lowell Park is a baseball venue in the village of Cotuit, Massachusetts, home to the Cotuit Kettleers of the Cape Cod Baseball League (CCBL). The former Elizabeth Lowell High School was located just to the west of the field. Lowell Park is one of three CCBL ballparks that does not have lights.

Members of the Lowell family originally donated a parcel of land and school building to the town of Barnstable in 1906. The school remained in use into the 1920s, but was demolished a decade later. Harvard University president A. Lawrence Lowell maintained a home in Cotuit, and his presence attracted enough other members of the Harvard community that the village was often referred to as "Summer Harvard".

The school building razed, the parcel remained in use as a ballpark, and has been managed and maintained by the Cotuit Athletic Association since the advent of the Kettleers in the late 1940s. A sizeable 2007 grant from the Yawkey Foundation and a subsequent multi-phase improvement project allowed for significant upgrades to Lowell Park. In 2015, surrounding lands were purchased in an effort to maintain the ballpark's character by preventing the possibility of future adjacent development. The campaign to "Keep Lowell Park Green" was publicly supported by 1967 Kettleers pitcher and later United States Ambassador to the United Nations, Bill Richardson, and the newly-acquired acreage allowed for the establishment of a half-mile interpretive nature trail at the park in 2021.

Lowell Park has been described as "a scene right out of a Norman Rockwell painting," and "a shining, secluded throwback to the golden age of baseball." Nestled within a wooded area just one quarter mile from Cotuit Bay, the setting has been the subject of a two-page aerial photo spread in Sports Illustrated, and has drawn comparisons to the Iowa baseball diamond portrayed in the Hollywood film Field of Dreams for the similar way it appears to have been carved out of the surrounding natural elements. Lowell Park has seen the Kettleers claim a CCBL-high 17 championships, and has been the summertime home of dozens of future major leaguers such as Will Clark, Joe Girardi, and Chase Utley.
