= Elinor Medill Patterson =

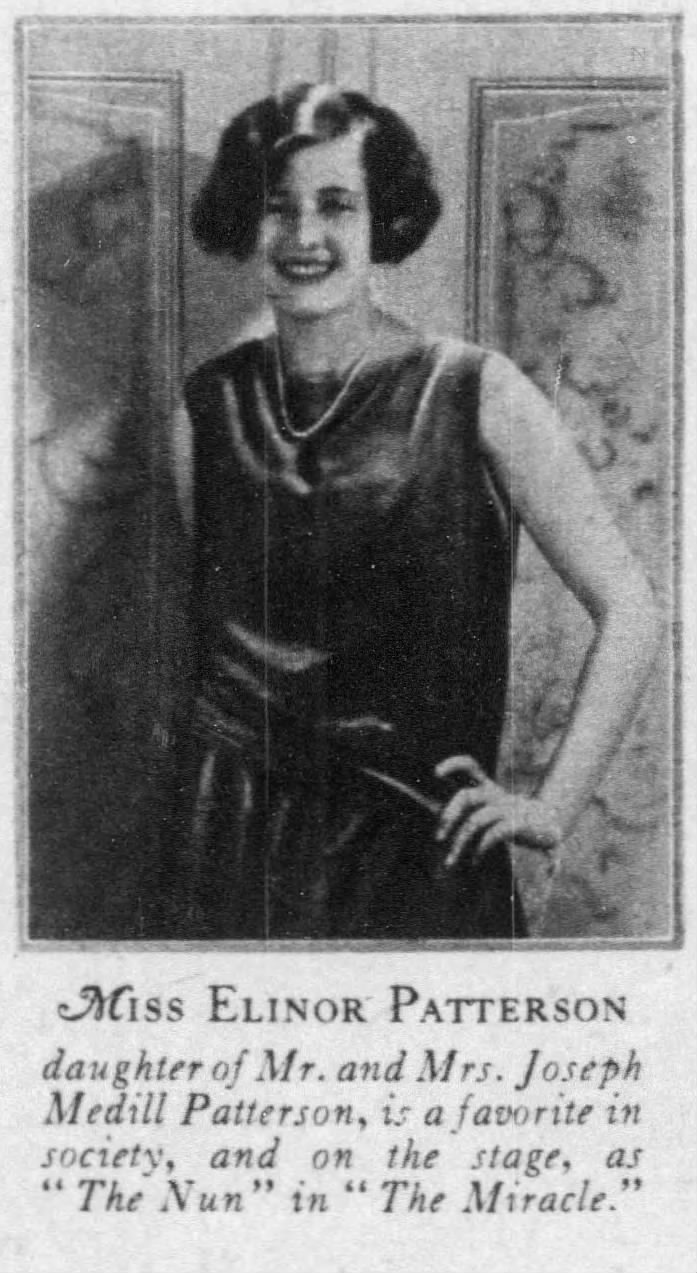
Elinor Patterson in the Chicago Tribune, 1926

Elinor Medill Patterson (October 1, 1903 – June 9, 1984) was a stage actress and the daughter of Joseph Medill Patterson and Alice Higinbotham.

== Family life ==
Elinor Medill Patterson was born in Chicago, Illinois to parents Joseph Medill Patterson and Alice Higinbotham on October 1, 1903. She was the eldest of three sisters; Alicia (born 1906) and Josephine (born 1913), and one half-brother James (born 1923). She was a niece of Cissy Patterson (her namesake), and great-granddaughter of Joseph Medill and Robert W. Patterson.

Elinor made her formal society debut in December 1923 at a ball and musical held by her parents, featuring performers from the Chicago Civic Opera Company. Elinor married Russell Sturgis Codman, Jr. (1896-1992) in Putnam, Connecticut on May 25, 1926 at age 23; their wedding was an elopement to which friends and relatives were not invited. Codman was a real estate broker and had been a Harvard oarsman. Elinor and Codman separated soon after, in November 1926, and Elinor divorced Codman in January 1929 on a charge of desertion, which Codman did not contest. She married her second husband, New York businessman and son of Clayton Mark, Griffith Mark (1904-1978), in Greenwich, Connecticut on September 28, 1929. Mark and Elinor had one daughter, Adrienne (1934-2006), in New York City on June 9, 1934. They divorced in January 1942, in a suit uncontested by her husband. Elinor married her third husband, Donald William Baker (1898-1992), Cornell University graduate, veteran of World War I, and son of a Michigan lumber operator, in Salisbury, Connecticut, on February 18, 1942. Baker had been married and divorced once previously to a Charlotte O'Brien. Elinor and Baker divorced in December 1970. Elinor died at age 80 in Greenwich, Connecticut, on June 9, 1984. Her obituary noted her advocacy for animal welfare, including serving on the advisory board of the Humane Society of the United States.

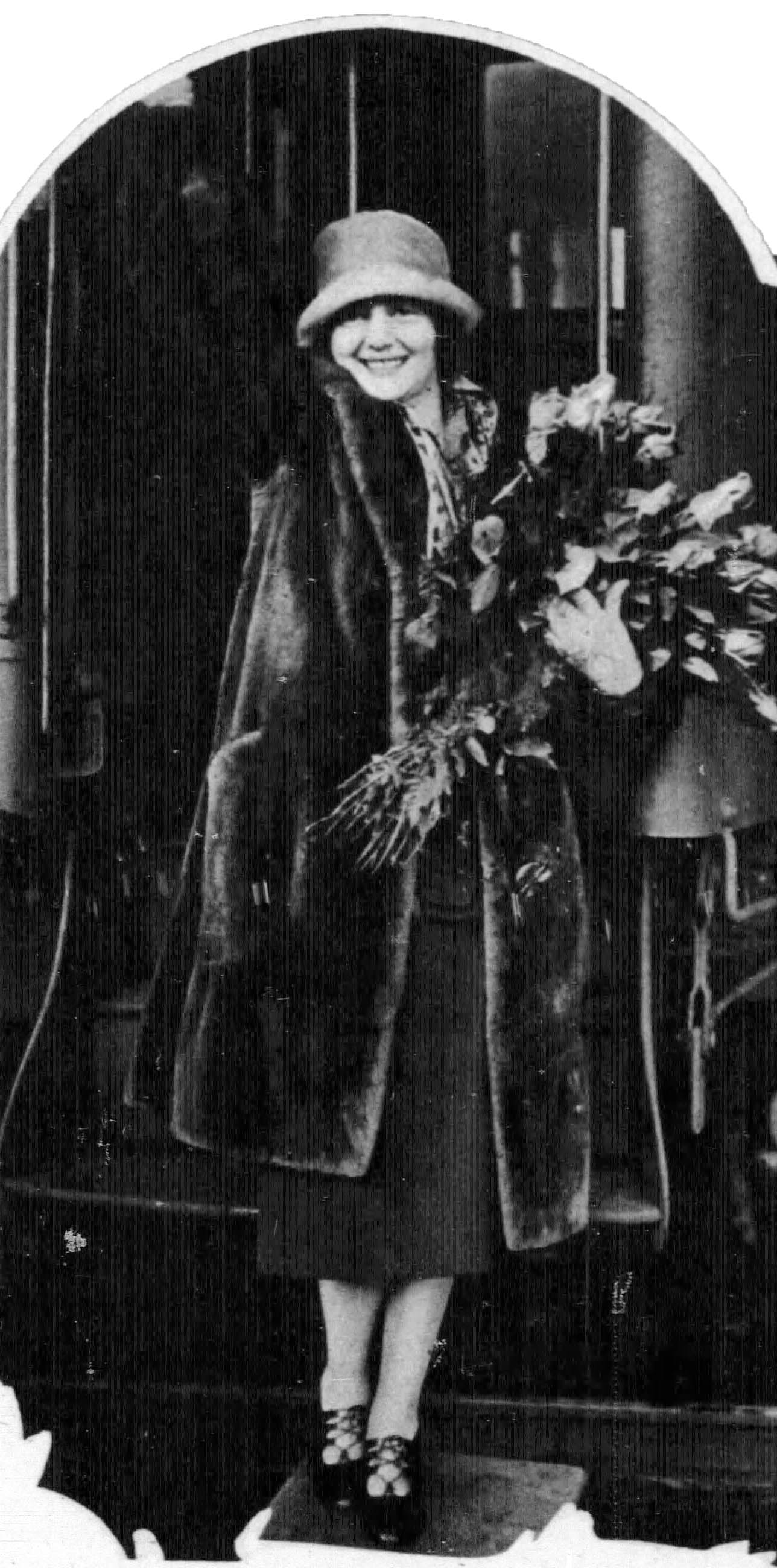
Elinor Patterson in the Chicago Tribune, 1927

== Acting career ==
In 1925 Elinor performed in plays "Lightin'" and "The Enchanted April" in Milwaukee, Wisconsin. Later in September 1925, Elinor made her Broadway debut playing Sister Megildis in play "The Miracle," a role which she shared with actress Iris Tree, alternating nights. Diana Duff-Cooper played the role of the Madonna. The production toured in Cincinnati, Boston, St. Louis, New York City, and Chicago. Elinor had approached producer Morris Gest for an extra role in the production and was surprised to be cast in a lead role. She (along with her colleague on the stage, Lady Diana) was featured in advertisements for Pond's Cream. She was contracted to reprise her role as Sister Megildis on a second tour beginning in October 1926, but the June before she married her first husband, Russell Codman, who wanted her to give up her stage career. She was scheduled just weeks after their elopement to travel to Europe and meet with producer Max Reinhardt about potential other acting roles. In an interview days after her wedding, she stated she intended to continue with her stage career, but admitted her husband "insists that he hates it - my staying on the stage."

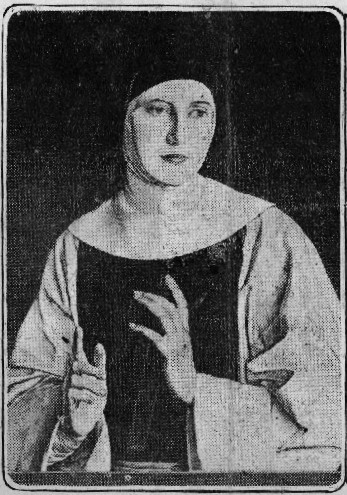
Elinor as Sister Megildis by Victor Hammer, 1929

She did follow through with her commitment to the second tour of "The Miracle," performing at the Salzburg Festival in Austria and traveling to Los Angeles, California, where in February 1927 it was reported she had been offered a moving picture contract by Carl Laemmle of Universal Pictures. In June 1927, the Chicago Tribune reported she had signed said contract. In December 1927 she was performing in New York City and Chicago as the lead Melodie in production "Behold This Dreamer!" based on the novel by Fulton Oursler. In October 1928, she was named in the cast of a revival of "The Beaux' Stratagem" by George C. Tyler.

In 1929 Elinor's portrait was painted in the guise of her Sister Megildis role by Victor Hammer of Austria, and it was featured in the twenty-seventh Carnegie Institute International Exhibition at the Art Institute of Chicago.
