= Paul Stevens (actor) =

American actor (1921–1986)

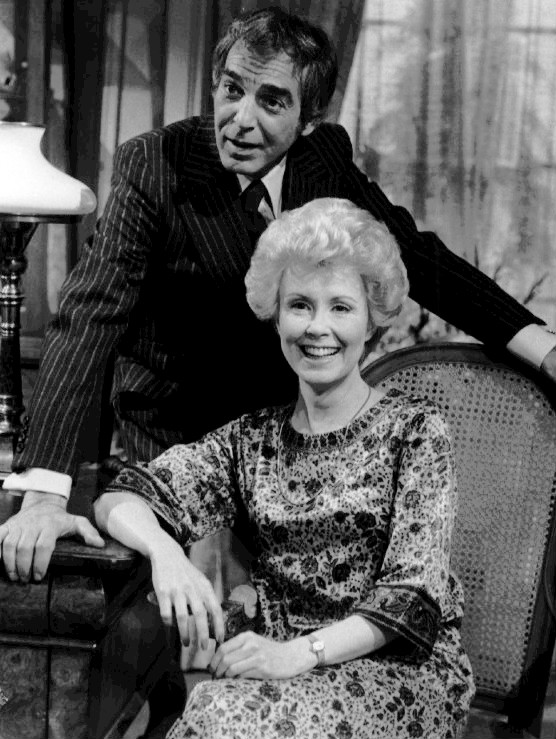
- Stevens as Brian Bancroft with Beverlee McKinsey on Another World, 1977.
- Born: January 17, 1921; Los Angeles, California, U.S.
- Died: June 4, 1986 (aged 65); New York City, U.S.
- Occupation: Actor
- Years active: 1950–1985

Paul Stevens (January 17, 1921 – June 4, 1986) was an American film and television actor.

== Early life ==
Stevens was born in Los Angeles. He was a graduate of the University of California, Los Angeles, and studied at the Pasadena Playhouse.

== Career ==
=== Film ===
Stevens played Colonel Charles R. Codman in the 1970 film Patton. He also appeared in Exodus, as a key congressional witness in Advise and Consent and in Marlowe.

Stevens's television debut occurred on Playhouse 90. He portrayed Paul on the serial The Nurses. He appeared on the serial The Young and the Restless in 1975 (as Bruce Henderson) and on the soap opera Another World from 1977 to 1985 (as Brian Bancroft). Stevens also played Mendez, one of the leaders of the mutant underground, in Battle for the Planet of the Apes. Stevens was nominated for a Daytime Emmy Award as Outstanding Supporting Actor in a Drama Series for his role on Another World.

=== Television ===
Stevens was a guest star on many television series from 1954 until 1977, including The Man from U.N.C.L.E., The Wild Wild West ("The Night of the Samurai"), The Rockford Files (as two different characters in two episodes), The Streets of San Francisco, Baretta, Ironside, Police Story, Gunsmoke (as two different characters in two episodes), Mannix, Mission: Impossible, Hawaii Five-0, and McMillan and Wife.

=== Theatre ===
On Broadway, Stevens appeared in The Advocate (1963), Andorra (1963), General Seeger (1962), Compulsion (1957), and The Merchant of Venice (1953).

== Death ==
On June 4, 1986, Stevens died of pneumonia at Bellevue Hospital, aged 65.

== Filmography ==
Year	Title	Role	Notes
1950	Military Academy with That Tenth Avenue Gang	Cadet Corporal	Uncredited
1952	Hiawatha	Minor Role	Uncredited
1960	Exodus	Reuben	
1961	The Mask	Doctor Allan Barnes	
1962	Advise & Consent	Louis Newborn	
1965	Hercules and the Princess of Troy	Diogenes	Originally Made-For-TV; Later, Feature Film
1969	Marlowe	Dr. Vincent Lagardie	
1970	Patton	Colonel Charles R. Codman	
1971	Montserrat	Zavala	Television film
1972	Corky	Tobin Hayes	
1972	Melinda	Mitch	
1972	Rage	Col. William Franklin	
1973	Battle for the Planet of the Apes	Mendez	
1973	The Black Six	Detective Octavias	
