= Santuit Historic District =

Historic district in Massachusetts, United States

- U.S. National Register of Historic Places
- U.S. Historic district
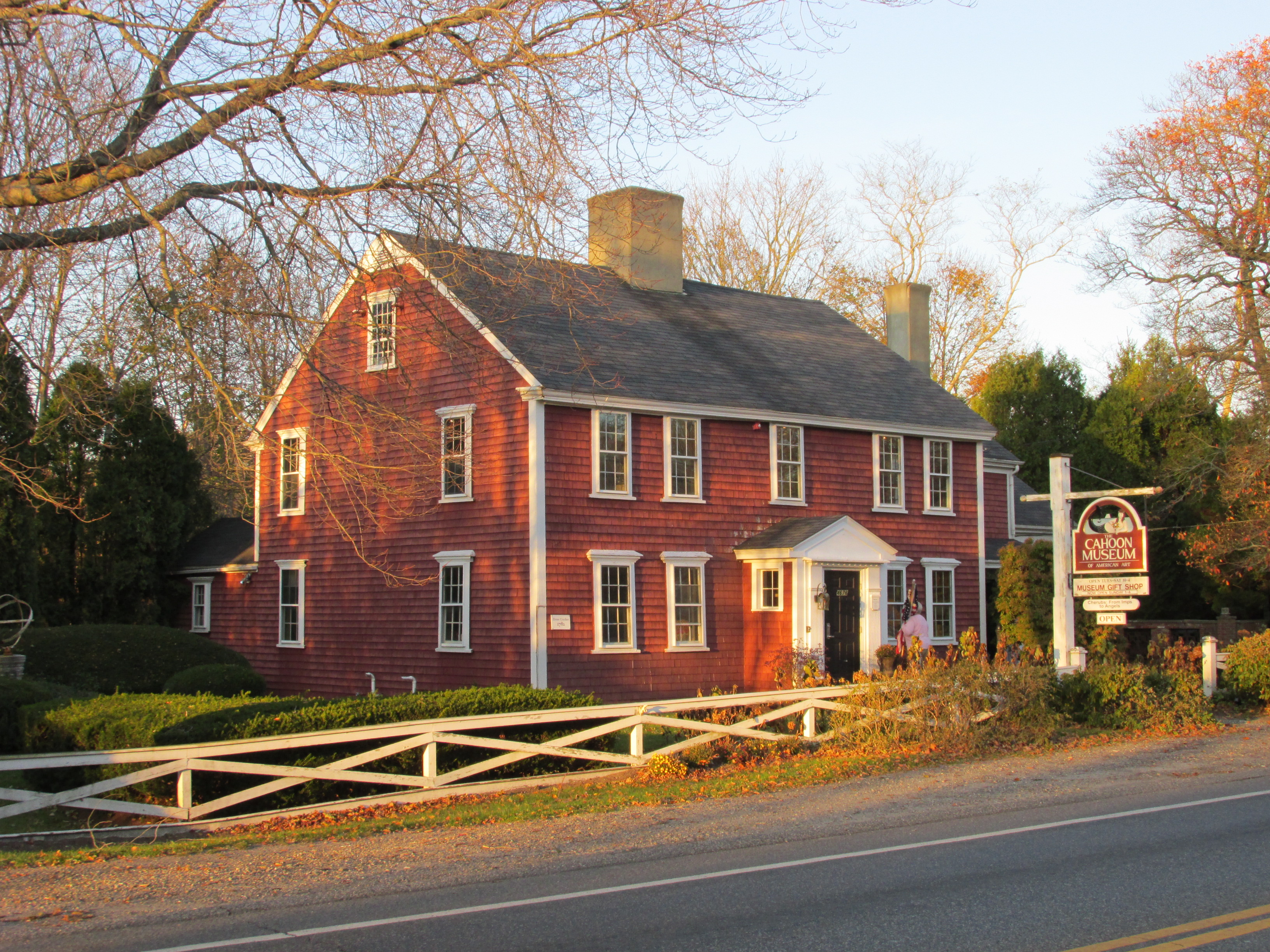
- The Cahoon Museum

- Location within Cape Cod Location within Massachusetts Location within the United States
- Location: Barnstable, Massachusetts
- Coordinates: 41°38′16″N 70°27′4″W
- Architectural style: Italianate, Georgian, Federal
- MPS: Barnstable MRA
- NRHP reference No.: 87000319
- Added to NRHP: November 10, 1987

The Santuit Historic District encompasses a cluster of historic houses around the junction of Falmouth Road (Massachusetts Route 28) and Main Street in the Santuit village of Barnstable, Massachusetts. It includes eight houses, six of which are historically significant for their association with the Crocker family, who were the first settlers of the area in the 18th century. The district was listed on the National Register of Historic Places in 1987.

The oldest house in the district is the Ebenezer Crocker House at 4698 Falmouth Road. It is a fairly typical Georgian house, five bays wide and 2-1/2 stories high, with a large central chimney. This house was supposedly dragged here c. 1739. The Alvan Crocker House at 4701 Falmouth was built c. 1769, and has some of the finest Georgian paneling, as well as surviving fragments of period wallpaper. The Zenas Crocker House at 4676 Falmouth, which is now home to the Cahoon Museum, is the third Georgian house, although it has a Federal style door surround with pilasters and transom window that was added later.

The Alvan Crocker Jr. House (4701 Falmouth) and Roland Crocker House (4631 Falmouth) were both built c. 1796, but are significantly different examples of Federal styling. Alvan's house is a vernacular 1 1/2-story Cape-style structure with three bays and a windowless extension, while Roland's is one of the finest high-style Federal houses outside Barnstable Village. The sixth house is that of Zenas Crocker III at 4632 Falmouth; it is a 2 1/2-story Italianate house, with round-arch windows and bracketed eaves.

== See also ==
- National Register of Historic Places listings in Barnstable County, Massachusetts
