= Sampson's Folly =

Historic house in Massachusetts, United States

- Sampson's Folly/Josiah Sampson House
- U.S. National Register of Historic Places
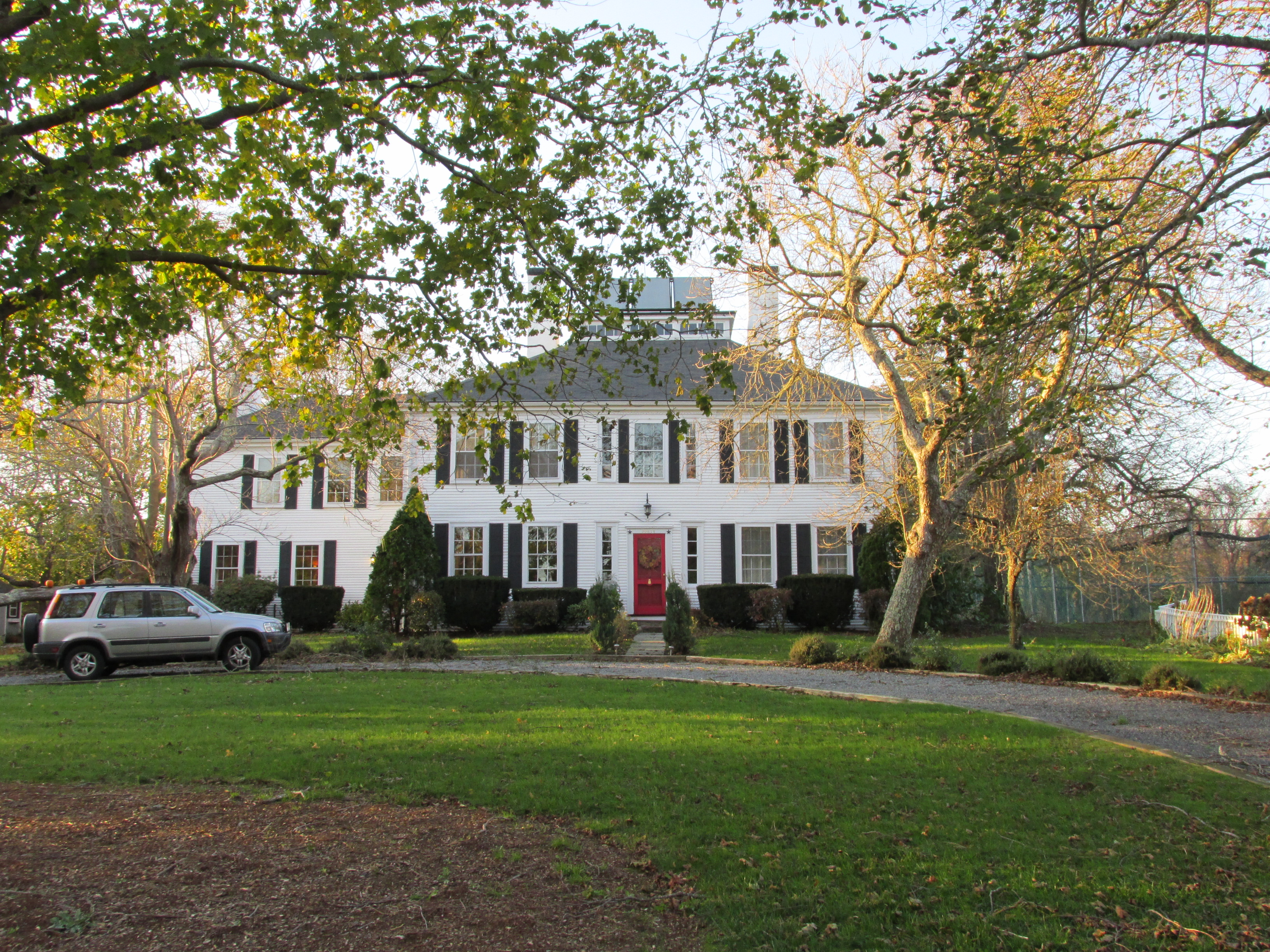

- Location within Cape Cod Location within Massachusetts Location within the United States
- Location: 40 Old King's Road, Barnstable, Massachusetts
- Coordinates: 41°37′49″N 70°26′53″W
- Built: 1807
- Architectural style: Federal
- MPS: Barnstable MRA
- NRHP reference No.: 87000326
- Added to NRHP: September 18, 1987

Sampson's Folly (also known as the Josiah Sampson House) is a historic house in the Cotuit village of Barnstable, Massachusetts. Built in 1807, it is the finest Federal style house in Cotuit and one of the finest in all of Barnstable. The Sampsons, intermarried with the locally prominent Crockers, were major landowners in the area. The house was listed on the National Register of Historic Places September 18, 1987.

== Description and history ==
The Sampson House is set on the northwest side of Old King's Road, just north of its junction with Sampsons House Knob. It is a large two-story wood-frame structure, whose main block has a hip roof topped by a monitor section. That block is five bays wide, symmetrically arranged, with a central entrance flanked by sidelight windows and topped by a simple cornice. The building's corners are trimmed with quoining, a detail repeated on the three-bay ell that extends to the left.

The house was built in 1807 by Josiah Sampson and is Cotuit's most elaborate Federal style house. Sampson had married the daughter of Captain Joseph Crocker, whose family owned much land in the area. In the 19th century the land was farmed by members of the Sampson and Crocker families. In the 1940s and 1950s the house was used as a clubhouse, but it has since been returned to single-family use. Most of the Crocker family land has been developed, for residential uses and a nearby golf course.

== See also ==
- National Register of Historic Places listings in Barnstable County, Massachusetts
