= Margaret Jordan Patterson =

American painter

- Born: 1867; Soerabaija, Java, Dutch East Indies
- Died: 1950 (aged 82–83); Boston, Massachusetts
- Known for: Painting, Printmaking
- Movement: American Arts and Crafts

Margaret Jordan Patterson (1867–1950) was an American woodblock printmaker and painter.

== Early life and education ==
The daughter of a Maine sea captain, Patterson was born on board her father's ship near Surabaya, Java. She then grew up in Boston and Maine.

Her first art instruction came from a correspondence course given by the publisher Louis Prang. She then studied at the Pratt Institute starting in 1895. She also studied with Claudio Castellucho in Florence and Hermenegildo Anglada Camarasa in Paris.

She also developed friendships with the artists Arthur Wesley Dow and Charles Woodbury. In 1910 she learned how to create color woodblock prints from Ethel Mars.

== Career ==
She later became head of the art department at Dana Hall School in Wellesley, Massachusetts, and held that job until she retired in 1940. She also worked as an art teacher in public schools in Massachusetts and New Hampshire.

Some of her awards are honorable mention at the Panama–Pacific International Exposition in 1915, and a medal from the Philadelphia Watercolor Club in 1939.

Her art is now held in the Cleveland Art Museum, the Oakland Art Museum, the Metropolitan Museum of Art, The Minneapolis Institute of Art, the Museum of Fine Arts Boston, the Princeton University Art Museum, the Smithsonian American Art Museum, and the Victoria and Albert Museum.

== Gallery ==
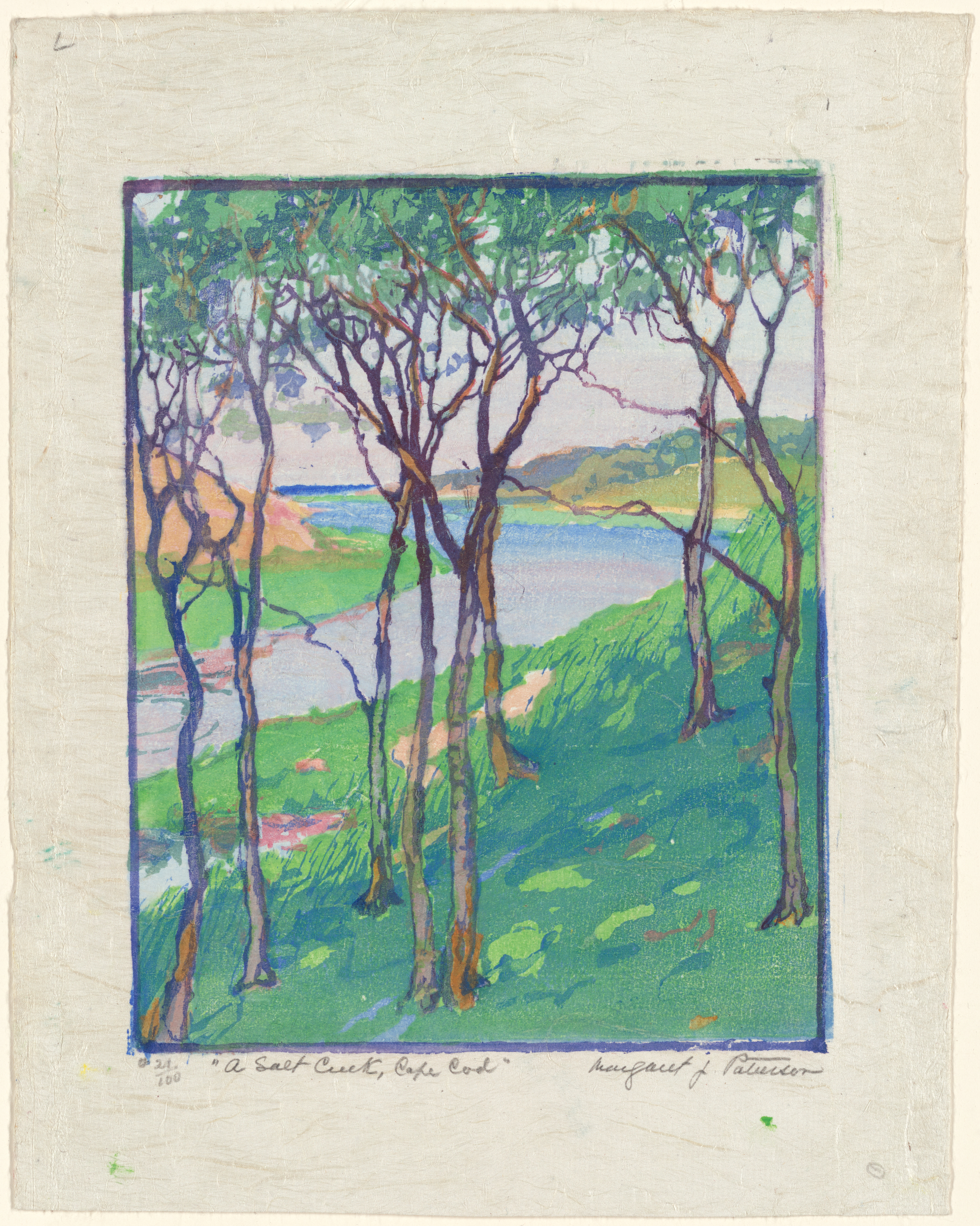
A Salt Creek, Cape Cod

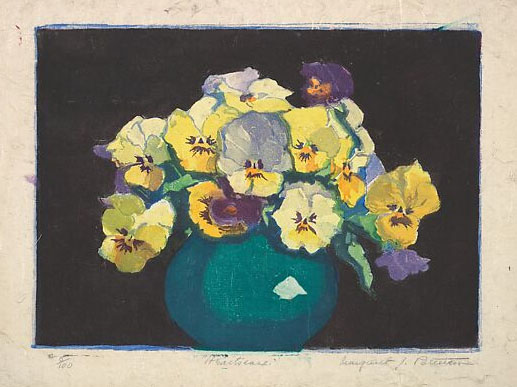
Heartsease

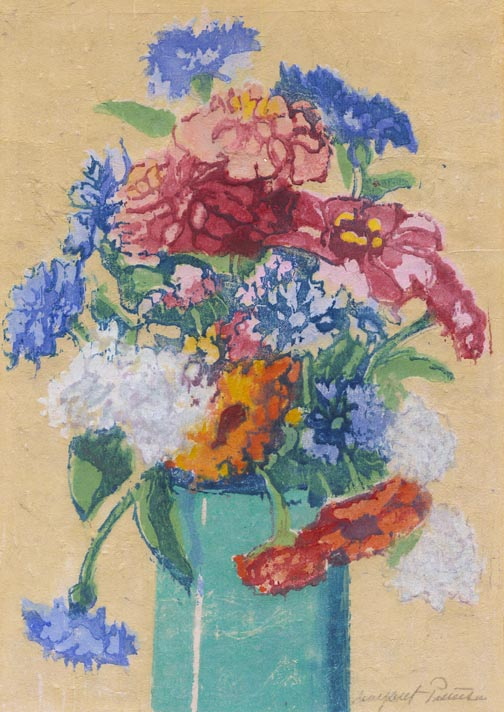
Zinnias and Bachelor Buttons

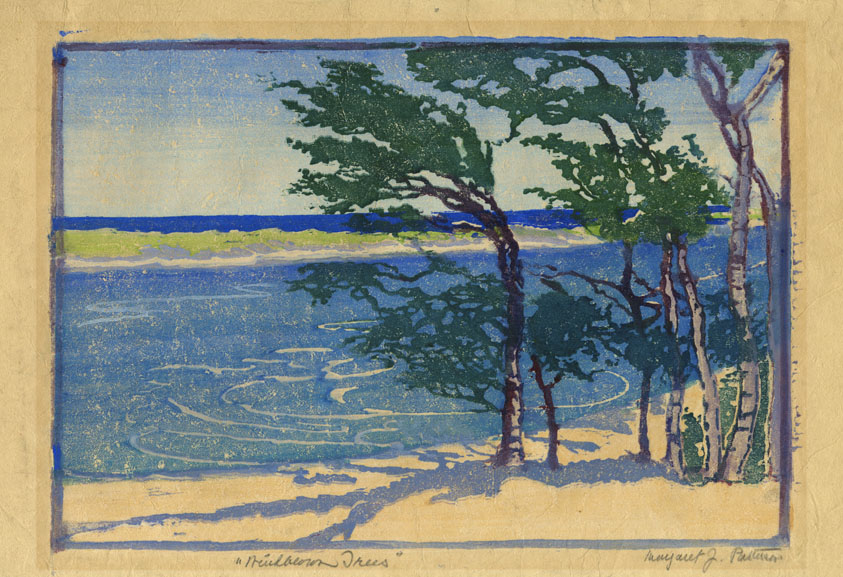
Windblown Trees

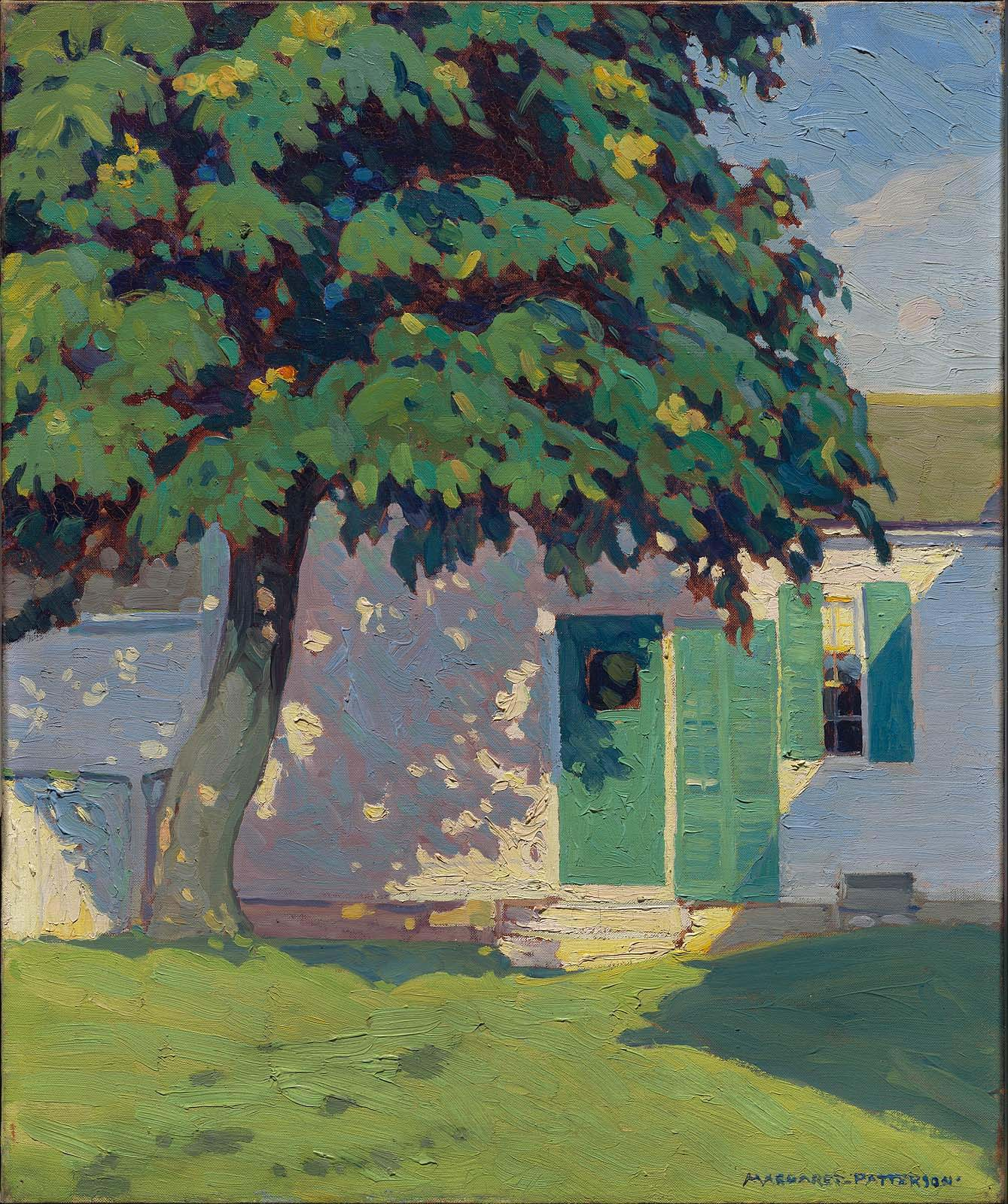
Aunt Polly's Back Door
