= Ralph Cahoon =

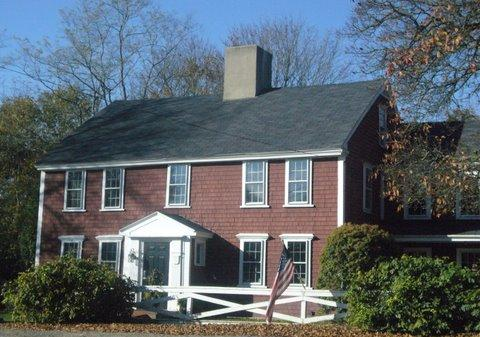
Cahoon Museum in Cotuit, Massachusetts

Ralph Eugene Cahoon, Jr. (1910 - 1982) was an artist and furniture decorator.

== Early life ==
Cahoon was born in Chatham, Massachusetts in 1910 to a family directly descended from the first Dutch Settlers of Cape Cod. Growing up close to the Atlantic Ocean, young Ralph spent many of his days sailing, fishing, digging clams, and sketching the coast. As he grew older, clamming and fishing slowly became secondary to his burgeoning interest in art. By the time he attended high school, he had started to apply his artistic interest and talent by taking a correspondence course in cartoon drawing and even submitted works to his school paper.

Upon graduation Ralph attended Boston's School of Practical Art where he focused primarily on commercial art, rather than his preference of decorative art. Frustrated with the ideological differences he encountered in art school, he returned to his native Cape Cod after his graduation.

== Career ==
Cahoon's young career took a dramatic turn in 1930 when he met and subsequently married (in 1932) a young Harwich woman named Martha Farham. The daughter of a well-respected and successful furniture decorator, Axel Farham, Martha introduced Ralph to the art of furniture decoration. Under her father's tutelage Martha had become adept at free-hand decoration and introduced Ralph to the technique. After their marriage, the Cahoons moved to Osterville, and later to Cotuit where they would start a successful business decorating and selling antique furniture.

In 1953 their careers took another twist when one of their customers, the wealthy New York socialite, art dealer, and future co-owner of the New York Mets, Joan Whitney Payson convinced them to frame some of their designs. Furthermore, Payson offered to show their works in her Long Island Gallery. Their foray from furniture decoration into “wall art” proved successful and both Cahoons went on to produce numerous works over the ensuing decades.

While much of their earlier furniture decoration shared the same Pennsylvania Dutch inspired motifs, their easel paintings marked the first significant diversion in Ralph and Martha's palettes and styles. While Martha continued to work in muted tones, Ralph experimented with brighter and more contrasting colors. More importantly, Ralph developed the subject matter and style that made his paintings must haves for any distinguished family that summered on the Cape.

Although he did not entirely abandon his Pennsylvania folk art roots, Ralph started painting whimsical scenes of sailors and mermaids frolicking on the backs of whales, in hot air balloons, on majestic ships, and countless other fantastic settings. As his commissions grew, Ralph would often incorporate his patron's businesses, homes, or professions into the finished work along with the standard mermaids and sailors.

In the end, Ralph Cahoon's paintings were successful because they attracted a client base of wealthy, old money families that frequented vacationed or owned estates on the Cape or the Islands. The carefree, lighthearted antics portrayed in Ralph's paintings appealed to patrons’ romantic associations with the Cape and were neither pretentious nor controversial.

Ralph continued painting up until his death in 1982. Martha continued painting after Ralph's death and even in her waning years continued to produce small crayon drawings up until her death in 1999.

Today Ralph Cahoon's paintings are highly sought after by collectors with his more important paintings exceeding $100,000 at public auction. The Cahoon Museum of American Art in Cotuit, Massachusetts features many of Cahoon's works.
