= Santuit River =

River in Massachusetts, United States

Coordinates: 41.617°N 70.450°W

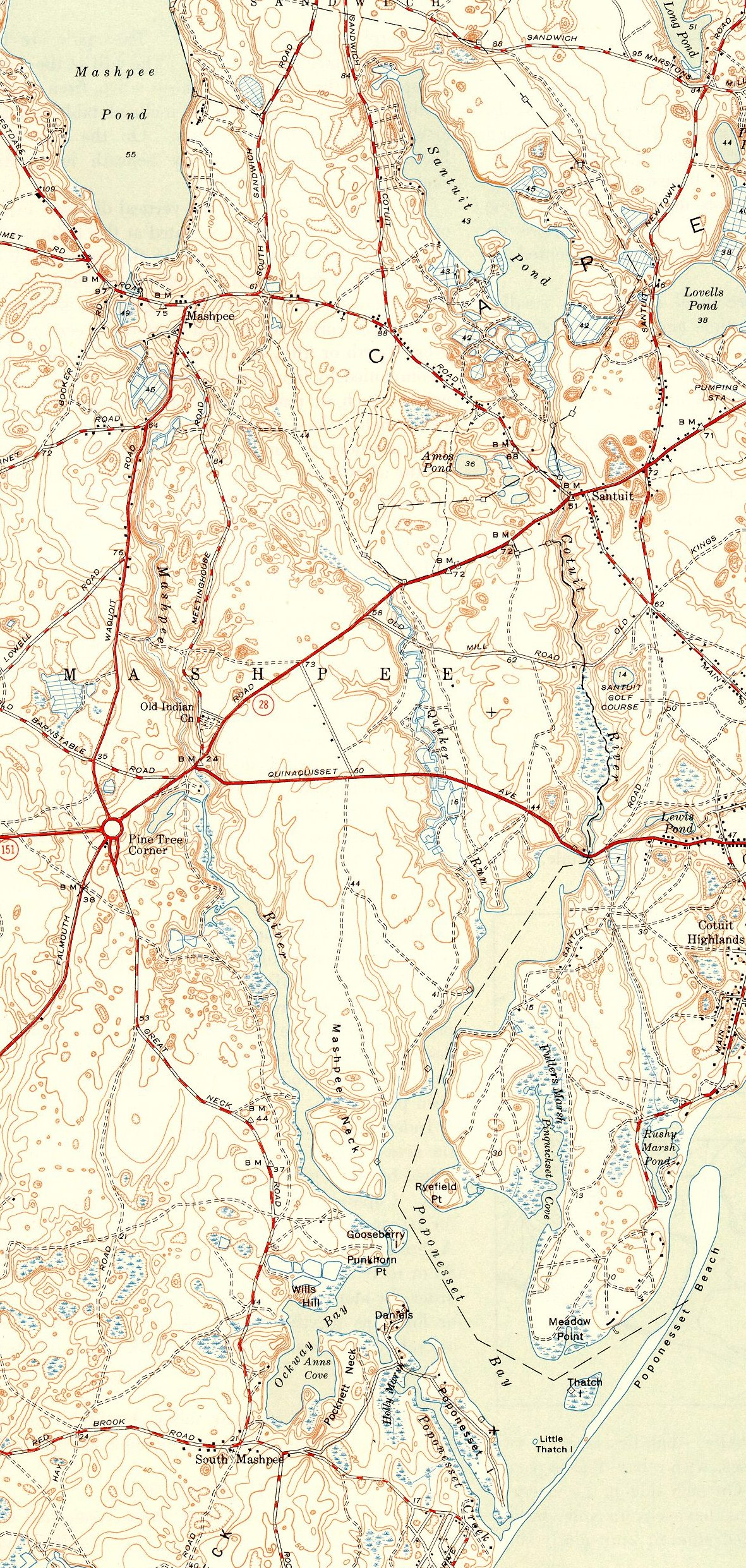
Santuit River and environs

The Santuit River, also known as the Cotuit River, is a 2.3-mile-long (3.7 km) river marking the boundary between Mashpee and Cotuit, Massachusetts, on Cape Cod.

The river flows south from the southern end of Santuit Pond into Popponesset Bay (also known as Shoestring Bay) on the south shore of Cape Cod.

The river was a vigorous herring/alewife run and is known to support sea-run brown trout. In the early 1990s, it was alleged that overpumping by an adjacent golf course caused the river to run dry. The golf course denied these allegations.
