= 45th Massachusetts Infantry Regiment =

45th Regiment Massachusetts Volunteer Infantry
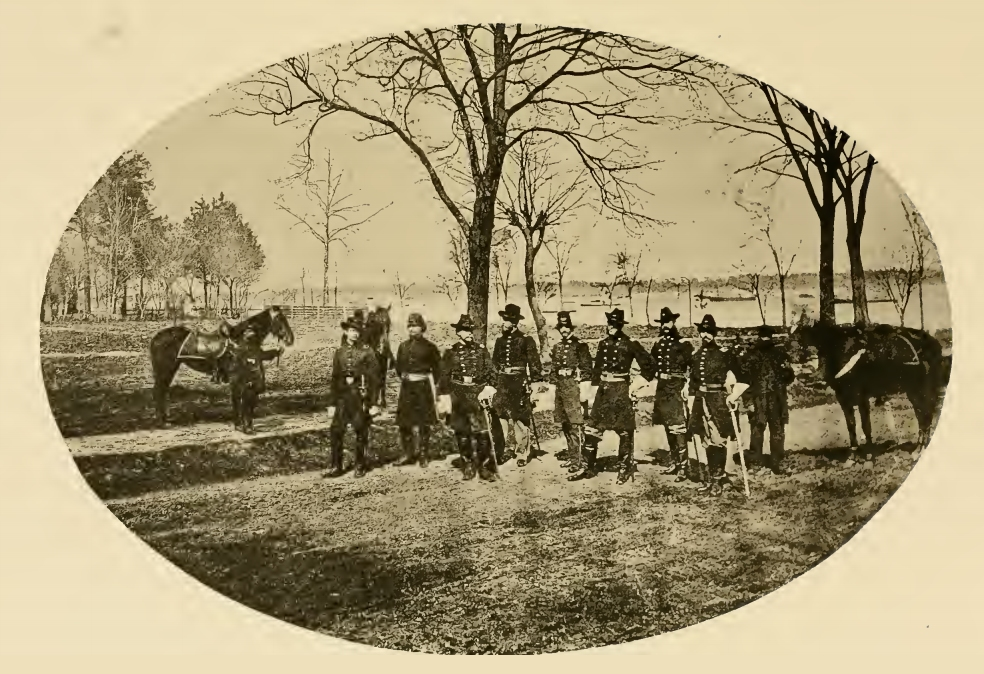
- Field and staff officers, 45th M. V. M.
- Country: United States
- Allegiance: Union
- Branch: Union Army
- Type: Infantry
- Engagements: American Civil War: Battle of Kinston

Commanders
- Notable commanders: Charles R. Codman; John G. Foster; Thomas J.C. Amory

45th Regiment Massachusetts Volunteer Infantry was an infantry regiment in the Union army during the American Civil War. The regiment trained at Camp Meigs in Readville, Massachusetts before traveling to North Carolina, where they fought in the Battle of Kinston in December 1862, and in skirmishes in and around New Bern, North Carolina in the spring of 1863. They suffered heavy casualties in battle and due to fever. In June they returned to Boston, where they patrolled the streets to quell any draft riots, and were discharged on July 21. They were commanded by Colonel Charles R. Codman (1829-1918).

== Image gallery ==
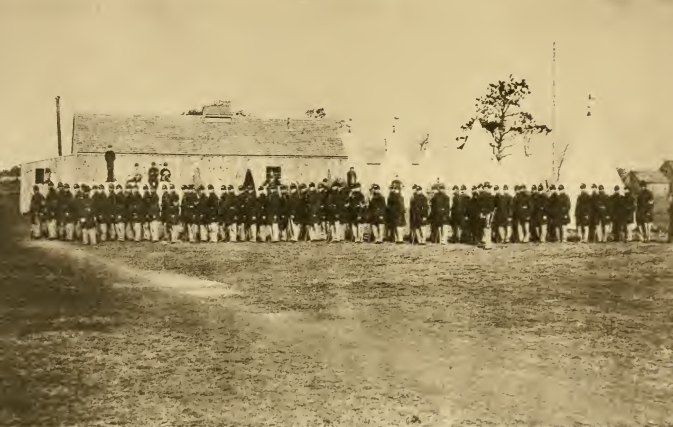
Company A at Readville

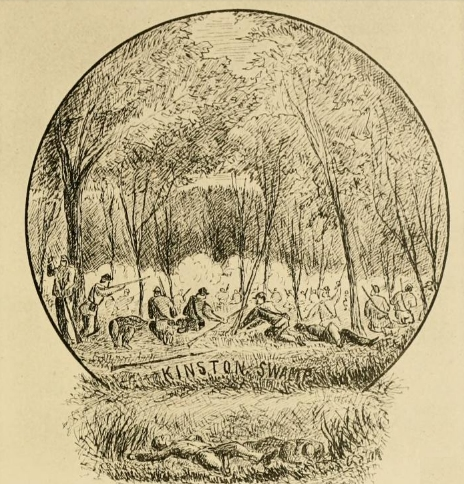
Kinston Swamp

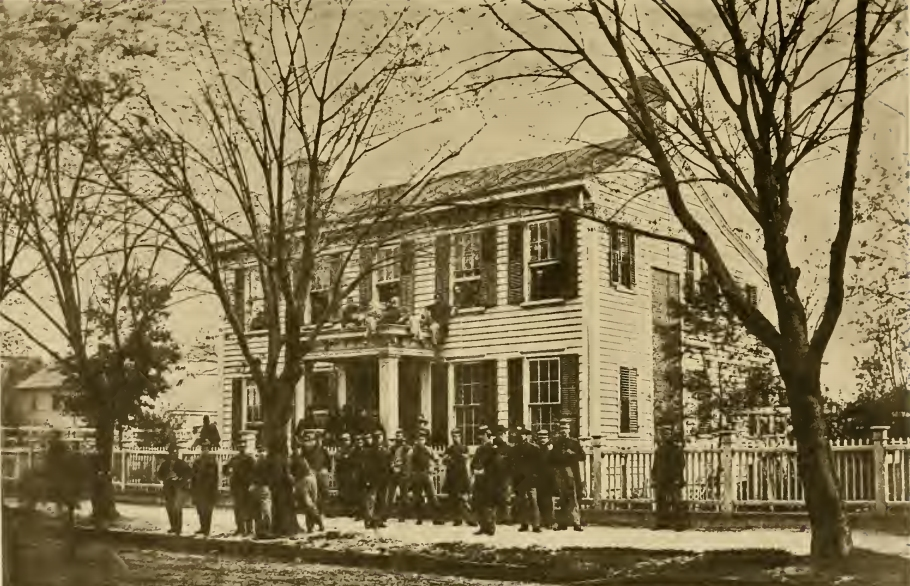
Company A at New Bern

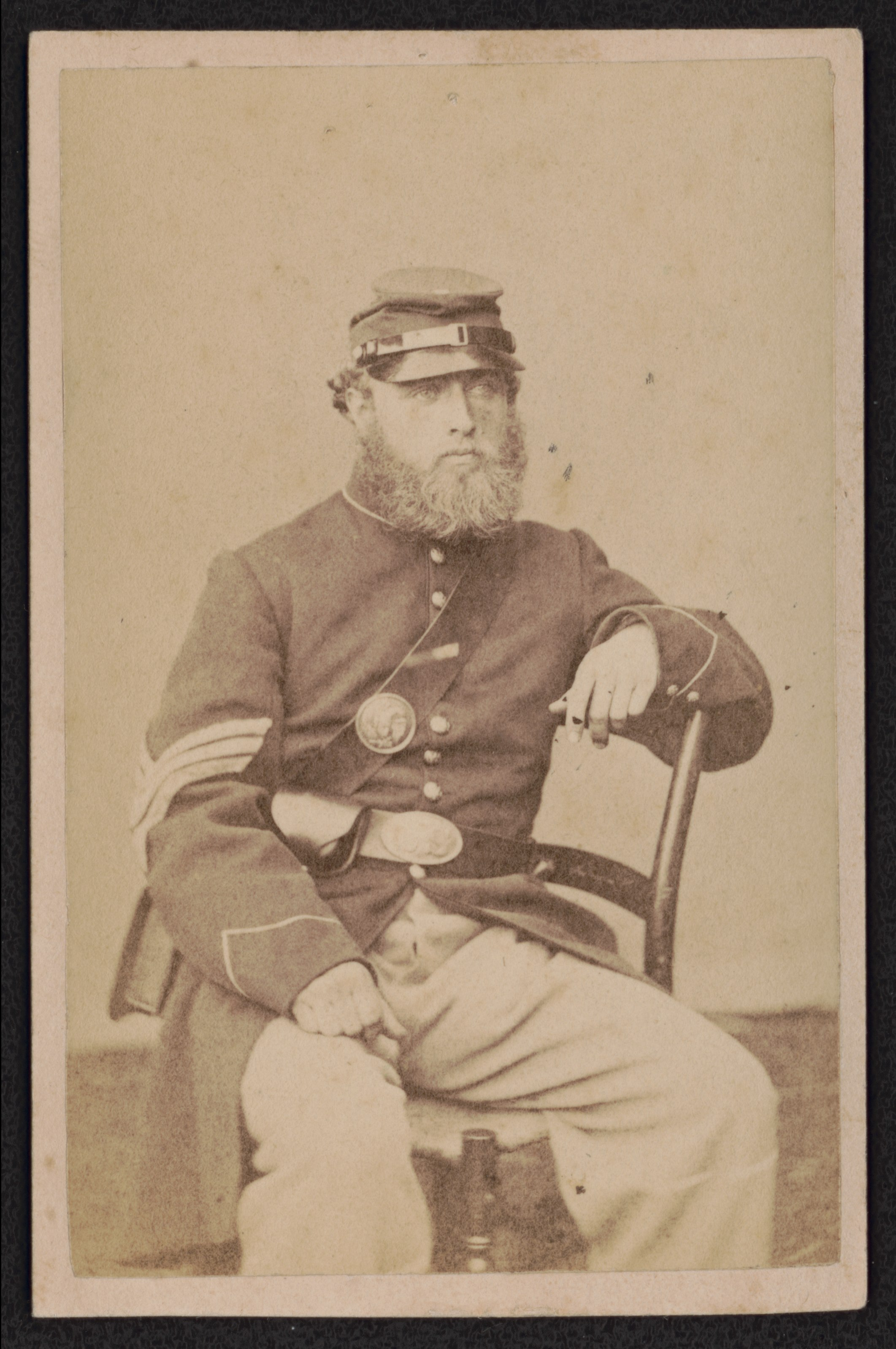
Sergeant Theodore Parkman of Co. H, 45th Massachusetts Infantry Regiment, 1862. He was killed at Whitehall, N.C.

== See also ==
- List of Massachusetts Civil War units
- Battle of New Bern (1862)
- Battle of New Bern (1864)
- Massachusetts in the Civil War
