= Battle of Kinston =

Battle of the American Civil War

Coordinates: 35.2441°N 77.5847°W

- Part of the American Civil War
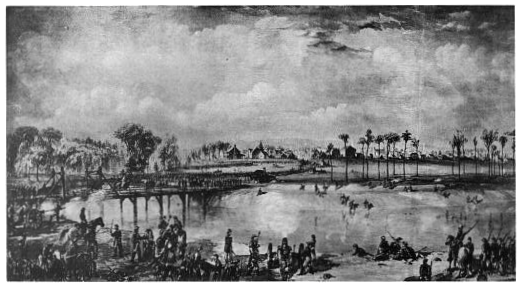
- Capture of Kinston, North Carolina
Date	December 14, 1862
Location	Lenoir County, North Carolina
Result	Union victory

Belligerents
United States (Union)	(Confederate States of America) CSA (Confederacy)

Commanders and leaders
John G. Foster	Nathan Evans

Units involved
Department of North Carolina, 1st Division 12,000 * 46th Massachusetts Infantry Regiment	Evan's Brigade 2,400

Strength
10,000	4,000

Casualties and losses
260	525
- Kinston Battlefield
- U.S. National Register of Historic Places
- U.S. Historic district
- Location within North Carolina Location within the United States
- Nearest city: Kinston, North Carolina
- Area: 614 acres (248 ha)
- Built: 1862
- NRHP reference No.: 06001104
- Added to NRHP: November 30, 2006

The Battle of Kinston was fought on December 14, 1862, in Lenoir County, North Carolina, near the town of Kinston, as part of the Goldsborough Expedition of the American Civil War.

A Union expedition led by Brig. Gen. John G. Foster left New Bern in December to disrupt the Wilmington and Weldon Railroad at Goldsborough. The advance was stubbornly contested by Brig. Gen. Nathan Evans's brigade near Kinston Bridge on December 14, but the Confederates were outnumbered and withdrew north of the Neuse River in the direction of Goldsborough. Foster continued his movement the next day, taking the River Road, south of the Neuse River.

== Gallery ==
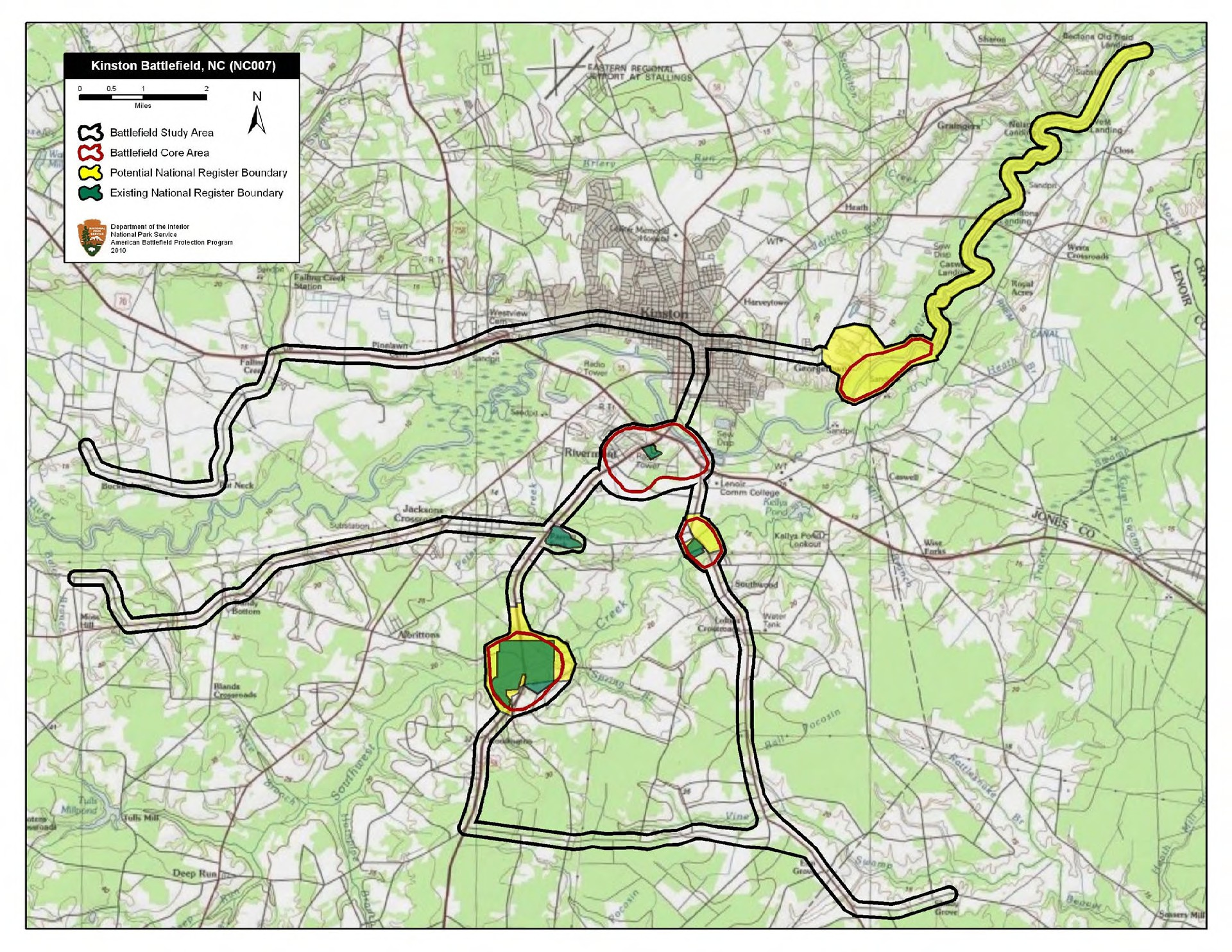
Map of Kinston Battlefield core and study areas by the American Battlefield Protection Program.

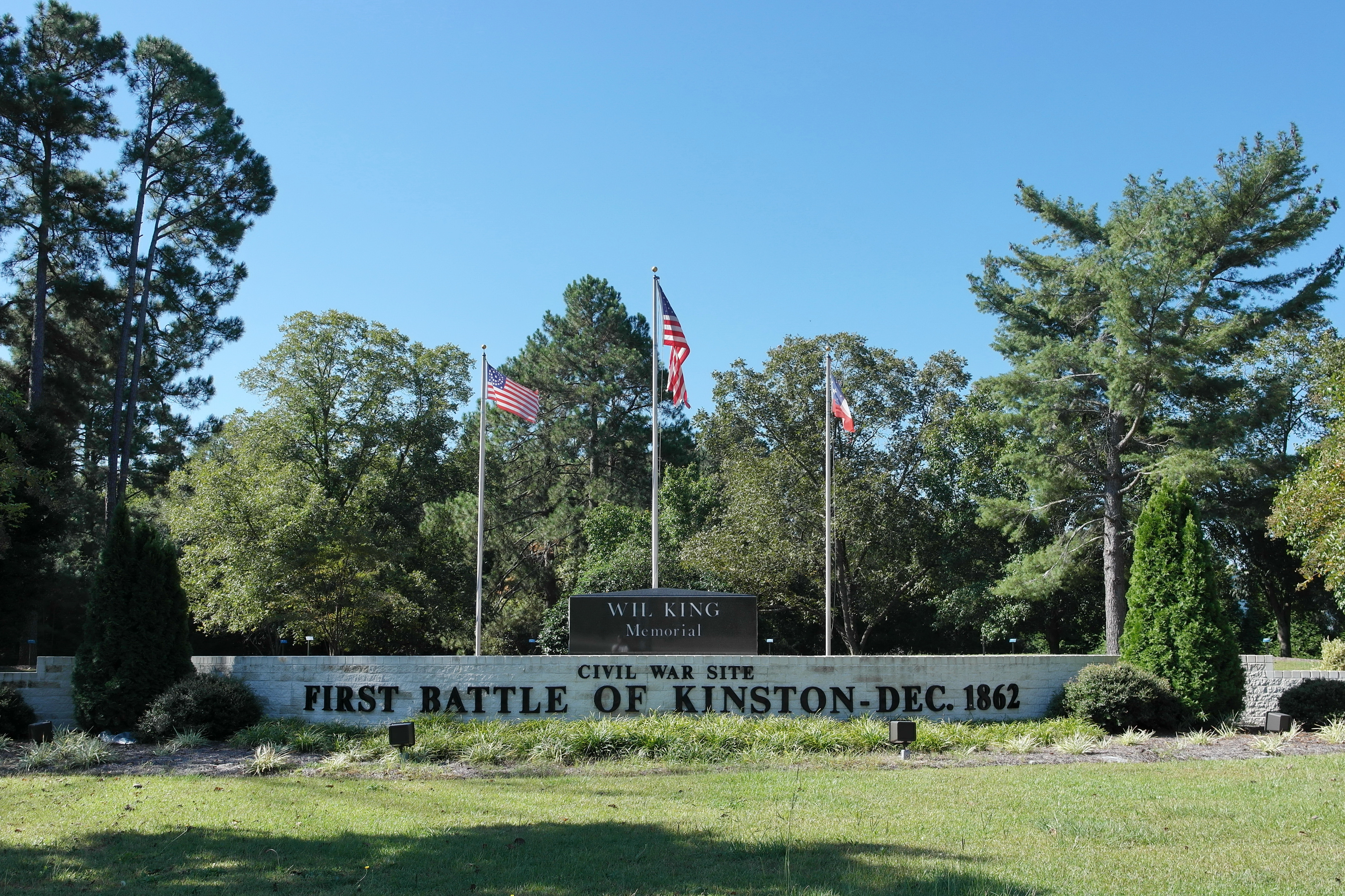
Kinston Battlefield Park

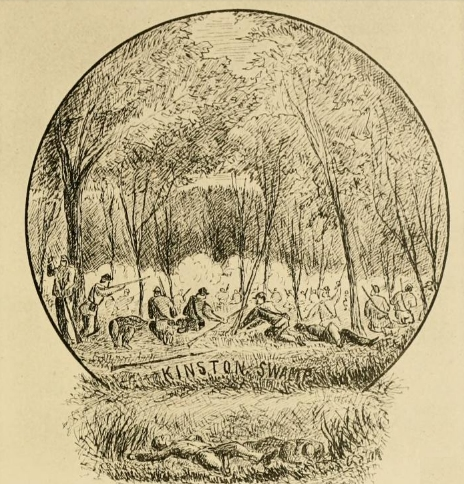
Drawing of Kinston Swamp by a member of the 45th Regiment Massachusetts Volunteer Infantry
