= Levi Wells Prentice =

American painter (1851–1935)

Levi Wells Prentice (December 18, 1851 – November 28, 1935) was an American still life and landscape painter. Prentice was associated with the Hudson River School.

Prentice grew up on a farm in Lewis County, New York By 1872, Prentice had traveled through the Adirondack Mountains, painting the views as well as the surrounding region. He opened his first studio as a landscape painter in Syracuse, New York in 1875.

Self-taught artist Levi Wells Prentice is best known for his realistic still life compositions of fruit arranged within a landscape, or abundantly spilling from bushel baskets. Early in his career, he painted portraits and landscapes of the Adirondack Mountain region of Lewis County, New York, his birthplace.

He followed a self-prescribed educational path, begun by the Hudson River School and reinforced by John Ruskin's (1819–1900) truth-to-nature principles laid out in his book Modern Painters. Although he can be allied to both schools of thought, Prentice can not be considered a member of either. This book has a photo of the artist in his early Brooklyn studio surrounded by his paintings and a complete essay on his life and work.

Prentice then turned to painting still life subjects when he moved briefly to Brooklyn, New York in 1883, focusing on fruit, in order of frequency apples, strawberries, peaches, plums, raspberries, cherries, muskmelons, pears, currants, pineapples, gooseberries, grapes and bananas usually piled high in pots or in natural settings.

Prentice married an English woman, Emma Roseloe Sparks, in Buffalo, New York in 1882 and had two children, Leigh (born March 22, 1887) and Imogene (born September 17, 1889). He moved around from 1903 to 1907 before settling in the Germantown district of Philadelphia. However, his work did not gain much recognition with historians until the 1970s. He was a member of the Brooklyn Art Association and frequently exhibited his paintings there.

In addition to his artistic talents, he was a craftsman who enjoyed making his own brushes, palettes and frames.

Art historian William H. Gerdts observed that there are several works by Prentice in which he achieves a quality of illusionism which is unsurpassed. In 1993, the skillful "illusionism" of Levi Wells Prentice was celebrated in a retrospective exhibition at the Adirondack Museum in New York. His works continue to be appreciated by modern collectors. He is represented in many museums including the New York State Museum, Museum of Fine Arts, Boston, Montclair Art Museum, Philbrook Museum of Art, Yale University Art Gallery.

Prentice died November 28, 1935, in Germantown, Pennsylvania.
