= Charles R. Codman =

American army officer

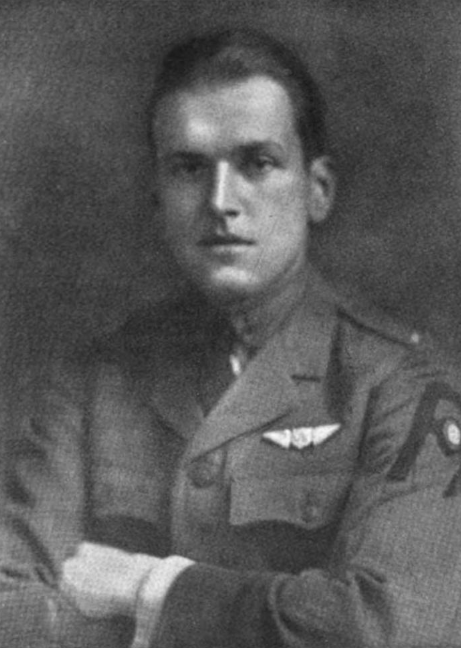
- Codman with the 96th Aero Squadron
- Born: February 22, 1893; Boston, Massachusetts
- Died: August 25, 1956 (aged 63); Boston, Massachusetts
- Relatives: Col. Charles R. Codman (grandfather); Russell S. Codman Jr. (brother)
- Military career
- Allegiance: United States of America
- Branch: United States Army Air Forces; United States Army
- Service years: 1917–1918; 1942–1945
- Rank: Colonel
- Units: 96th Aero Squadron; Seventh United States Army; Third United States Army
- Conflicts: World War I World War II
- Awards: Silver Star; Legion of Merit; Croix de Guerre; European-African-Middle Eastern Campaign Medal; World War I Victory Medal; World War II Victory Medal; Order of the Patriotic War Second Class (USSR)

Charles Russell Codman (February 22, 1893 – August 25, 1956) was an American writer, wine expert, and aide to General George S. Patton during World War II.

== Early life ==
Codman was a Boston, Massachusetts, native who was born into an old, notable, and wealthy New England family. After graduating from Harvard College in 1915, he enlisted in the American Field Service.

== Career ==
=== World War I ===
When the United States entered World War I, Codman became a pilot and saw combat in France as a first lieutenant in the 96th Aero Squadron. His heroics earned him the Silver Star and the Croix de Guerre.

=== Inner-war period ===
After the war, Codman worked part-time in France as a wine buyer and part-time in Boston as a real estate manager. When Nazi Germany invaded France in 1940, Codman was in the invaded country on a wine buying trip, and escaped to Lisbon on the last plane out of Bordeaux.

=== World War II ===
In 1942, Codman re-joined the United States Army at the rank of major. Because of his fluency in the French language, he was assigned as a translator to accompany Operation Torch, the Anglo-American invasion of French North Africa. In the latter stages of the North African Campaign, he met Patton, who soon asked him to serve as his aide-de-camp after his former aide, Maj. Richard Jenson, was KIA, which Codman did for the rest of the war. (In the 1970 movie Patton, Codman is played by Paul Stevens.)

He was also among Patton's staff officers decorated with Soviet military awards when Third Army linked up with Red Army units at war's end. Codman received the Order of the Patriotic War Second Class.

Codman left the Army in 1945 at the rank of colonel.

== Personal life ==
Codman's marriage to Theodora Larocque lasted more than 35 years. Their only child, also Charles Russell Codman, died at age 24 in Paris in 1946.

Codman returned to Boston and his real estate business after WWII, which he ran until his death in 1956.

== Publications ==
- Years and Years: Some Vintage Years in French Wines. Boston: S. S. Pierce, 1935.
- Contact. Boston: Little, Brown, 1937.
- Drive. Boston: Little, Brown, 1957.
