= Charles Codman Cabot =

American judge

- Born: November 22, 1900; Brookline, Massachusetts, U.S.
- Died: 1976 (aged 75–76)
- Education: Harvard College; Harvard Law School
- Occupations: Judge, law partner
- Children: Charles Codman Cabot Jr. (b. 1930)
- Parent(s): Henry Bromfield Cabot; Anna McMasters Codman Cabot

Charles Codman Cabot (November 22, 1900 – 1976) was an American judge of the Supreme Court of Massachusetts.

== Early life ==
Cabot was born in Brookline, Massachusetts. His father was Henry Bromfield Cabot, a lawyer. His mother was Anne Macmaster (Codman) Cabot, daughter of Charles R. Codman. He had five siblings: Henry Bromfield Cabot Jr. (b. 1894), Powell Mason Cabot (b. 1896), Paul Codman Cabot (b. 1898), cofounder of America's first mutual fund and "Harvard's [Endowment] Midas," Anne M. Cabot (b. 1903), and Susan M. Cabot (b. 1907).

Cabot graduated from Harvard College and Harvard Law School.

== Career ==
Cabot was a law partner of a prominent Boston law firm, and an associate justice of the Supreme Court of Massachusetts from 1943 to 1947. He was also the World War II U.S. Strategic Bombing Survey secretariat.

Cabot was president of the Boston Bar Association from 1950 to 1952. He was on the board of directors of the eugenicist Pioneer Fund from 1950 until 1973, and president of the Harvard Alumni Association.
