= Paul Codman Cabot =

American politician

- Born: October 21, 1898; Brookline, Massachusetts, US
- Died: September 1, 1994 (aged 95); Needham, Massachusetts, US
- Education: Harvard College; Harvard Business School
- Occupation: Businessman
- Title: Chief executive and chairman of the State Investment Corporation and treasurer of Harvard University
- Spouse: Virginia Converse (after 1924)
- Children: 5
- Parent: Henry Bromfield Cabot (father)
- Relatives: Charles Codman Cabot (brother)

Paul Codman Cabot (October 21, 1898 – September 1, 1994) was an American businessman. He was chief executive and chairman of the State Street Investment Corporation. He was also treasurer of Harvard University.

== Early life ==
A Boston Brahmin and a member of the Cabot family, Cabot was born in Brookline, Massachusetts. His father, Henry Bromfield Cabot, was a lawyer and investor. His brother was Charles Codman Cabot.

Cabot was educated at Harvard College and then Harvard Business School from which he graduated cum laude.

== Career ==
In 1924, he formed the State Street Investment Corporation. which was the second open-end mutual fund legally incorporated but the first to operate. He was one of the first practitioners of fundamental equity research including on-site management interviews and also among the first to favor the price-earnings ratio in his valuation work over dividend yield. These innovations contributed to outstanding investment performance for decades. During the 1920s he uncovered the unethical practices of certain other funds. Due to the fame this gained him he was able to influence important New Deal securities legislation such as the Revenue Act of 1936 and the Investment Company Act of 1940.

He was treasurer of Harvard University between 1948 and 1965, during which period the university's endowment grew from $177 million to over $1 billion.

He retired as chief executive of State Street in 1958, although he retained his position as chairman.

== Personal life ==
In September 1924, Cabot was married to Virginia Converse, a daughter of Frederick S. Converse, a prominent American composer. Together, they were the parents of:

- Paul C. Cabot Jr.
- Edmund C. Cabot
- Frederick C. Cabot
- Virginia Cabot
- Elizabeth Cabot

He died on September 1, 1994, at Deaconess–Glover Hospital (now Beth Israel Deaconess Hospital – Needham) in Needham.
