= Russell S. Codman Jr. =

American politician and real estate executive (1896–1992)

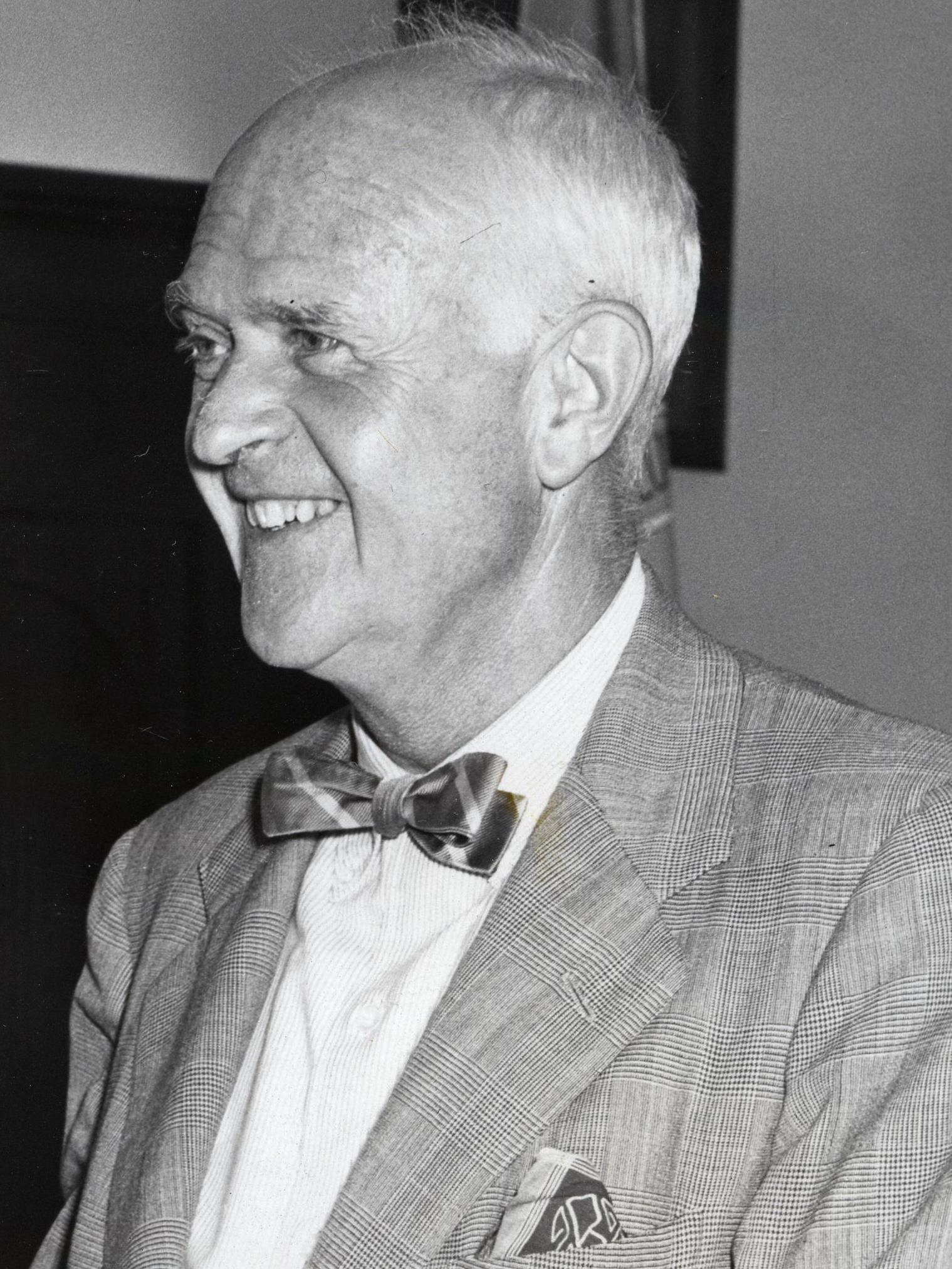
- Codman in the 1960s

Boston Fire Commissioner
- In office 1946–1950
- Preceded by: John I. Fitzgerald
- Succeeded by: Michael T. Kelleher

Personal details
- Born: June 15, 1896 Milton, Massachusetts
- Died: June 24, 1992 (aged 96) Burlington, Massachusetts
- Party: Republican
- Spouse(s): Elinor Medill Patterson (1925–1929; divorce); Jane Davies Ferguson (1947–1992; his death)
- Education: Harvard University
- Occupation: Real Estate Executive

Russell Sturgis Codman Jr. (June 15, 1896 – June 24, 1992) was an American real estate executive who served as commissioner of the Boston Fire Department from 1946 to 1950.

== Early life and education ==
Codman was born on June 15, 1896, in Milton, Massachusetts, to Russell Sturgis Codman and Anna Kneeland Crafts. He attended Noble and Greenough School, the Groton Academy, and Milton Academy and graduated from Harvard University in 1919.

== Military service ==
In 1915, Codman served with the Massachusetts State Militia in the Mexican Border War. He attended the first Plattsburgh camp and when the United States entered World War I, Codman was sent to the 151st Depot Brigade at Fort Devens. On December 31, 1917, he was commissioned a first lieutenant and assigned to the Machine Gun Company of the 74th Infantry. He was later attached to the headquarters of the 24th Infantry Division as an aide-de-camp to General Adrian Theodore Woodward. He was discharged on February 5, 1919.

== Business career ==
After graduating, Codman worked in the banking and brokerage business before joining his father's real estate firm. Codman served for many years as treasurer and director of Codman & Codman. He became the firm's president in 1956 following the death of his brother, Charles R. Codman. Codman also served as president and director of Congress Street Safe Deposit Vaults.

== Politics ==
A Republican, Codman broke with his party during the 1945 Boston mayoral election to campaign for James Michael Curley. Curley appointed Codman, a fire fighting enthusiast who had volunteered at many multiple alarm fires, to the position of fire commissioner. During his tenure as commissioner, Codman was credited with updating the department and making it one of the best equipped and modern big city fire departments in the U.S. Curley was defeated for reelection in 1949 and Codman was not retained by his successor, John Hynes.

On November 21, 1959, the Japanese government appointed Codman, who was president of the Japan Society of Boston and a member of the Visiting Committee to the Department of Far Eastern Civilization of Harvard University, as an Honorary Consul General for Japan at Boston. Codman's appointment made him the first Japanese representative in Boston since the Japanese declaration of war on the United States and the British Empire in 1941. In 1968 he was made a member of the Order of the Sacred Treasure, 3rd Class.

During the 1960s, Codman served on the Boston Finance Commission.

== Personal life and death ==
In 1925, Codman began pursuing Elinor Medill Patterson, a stage actress who was then playing a nun in Morris Gest's The Miracle and the daughter of publisher Joseph Medill Patterson. On May 25, 1926, the couple eloped in Putnam, Connecticut. Codman wanted Patterson to give up her acting career to become a housewife. Patterson, however, continued her acting career, appearing at the Salzburg Festival and signing with Universal Pictures in 1927. The couple divorced in 1929.

On June 26, 1947, Codman, 50, married Jane Davies Ferguson, 22, at her family's home in Newton Center, Massachusetts. They had three daughters. The Codmans were longtime residents of Manchester-by-the-Sea, Massachusetts.

An avid rower, Codman won the 1929 American Henley at Philadelphia and later won the National Association of Amateur Oarsmen's senior singles title.

Codman was a member of the Somerset Club, Union Boat Club, Longwood Cricket Club, Harvard Club of Boston, and was a founding member of Le Club des Arts Gastronomiques of Boston. Codman also served as president of the French Center of New England and was made a Chevalier of the Legion d'honneur in 1951. In 1962 he was promoted to officer in the legion.

A noted wine connoisseur, Codman served as a wine consultant for S.S. Pierce and authored Vintage Dinners.

Codman died on June 24, 1992, at the Lahey Clinic. He was 96 years old.
