= Robert Wilson Patterson Jr. =

American newspaper editor and publisher

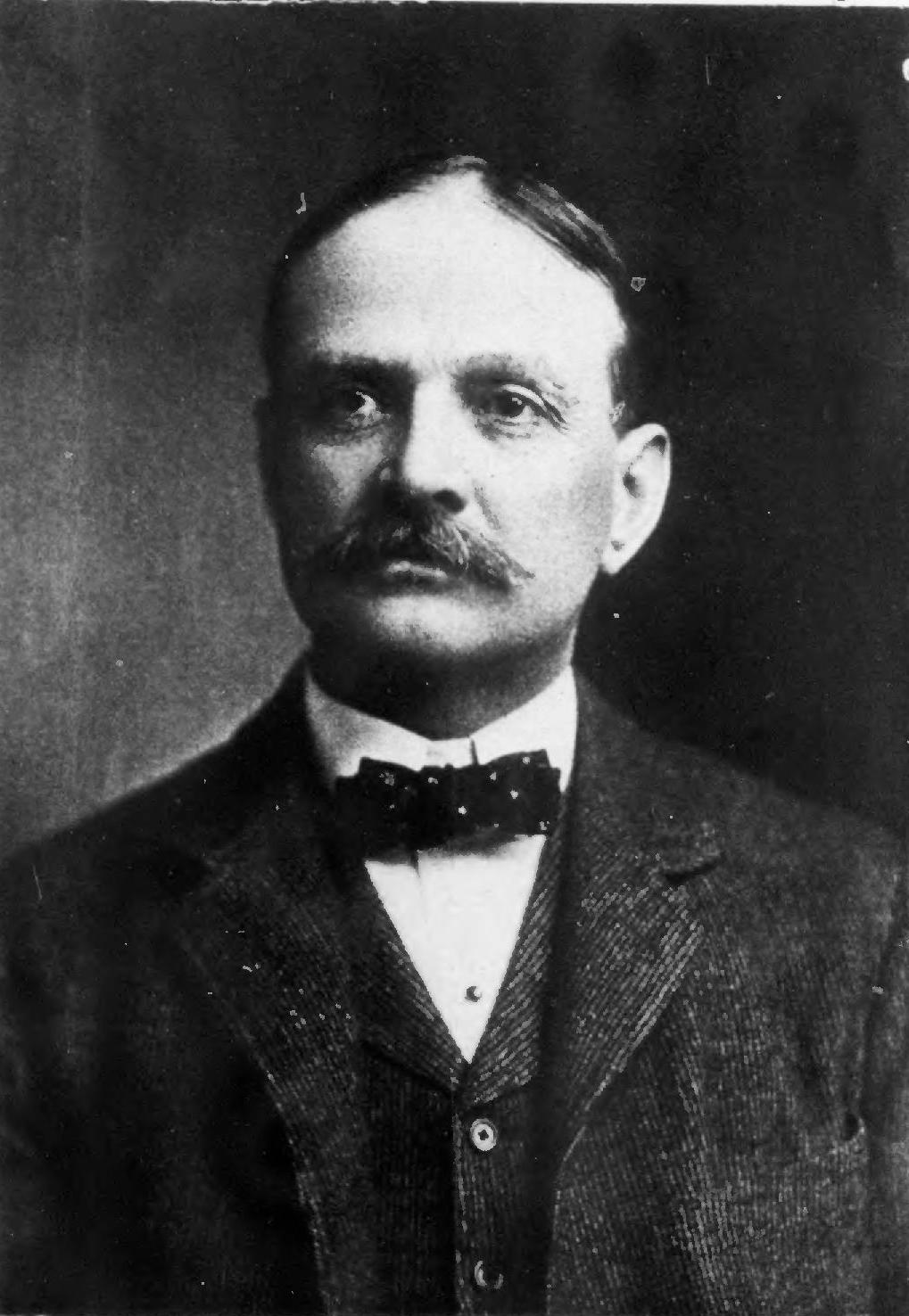
Robert W. Patterson

Robert Wilson Patterson Jr. (1850–1910) was an American newspaper editor and publisher.

== Early life ==
He was born in Chicago, attended Lake Forest Academy in Lake Forest, Illinois, and graduated from Williams College in 1871, and then began the study of law. His father was Robert W. Patterson, Presbyterian minister and founder of Lake Forest University.

== Career ==
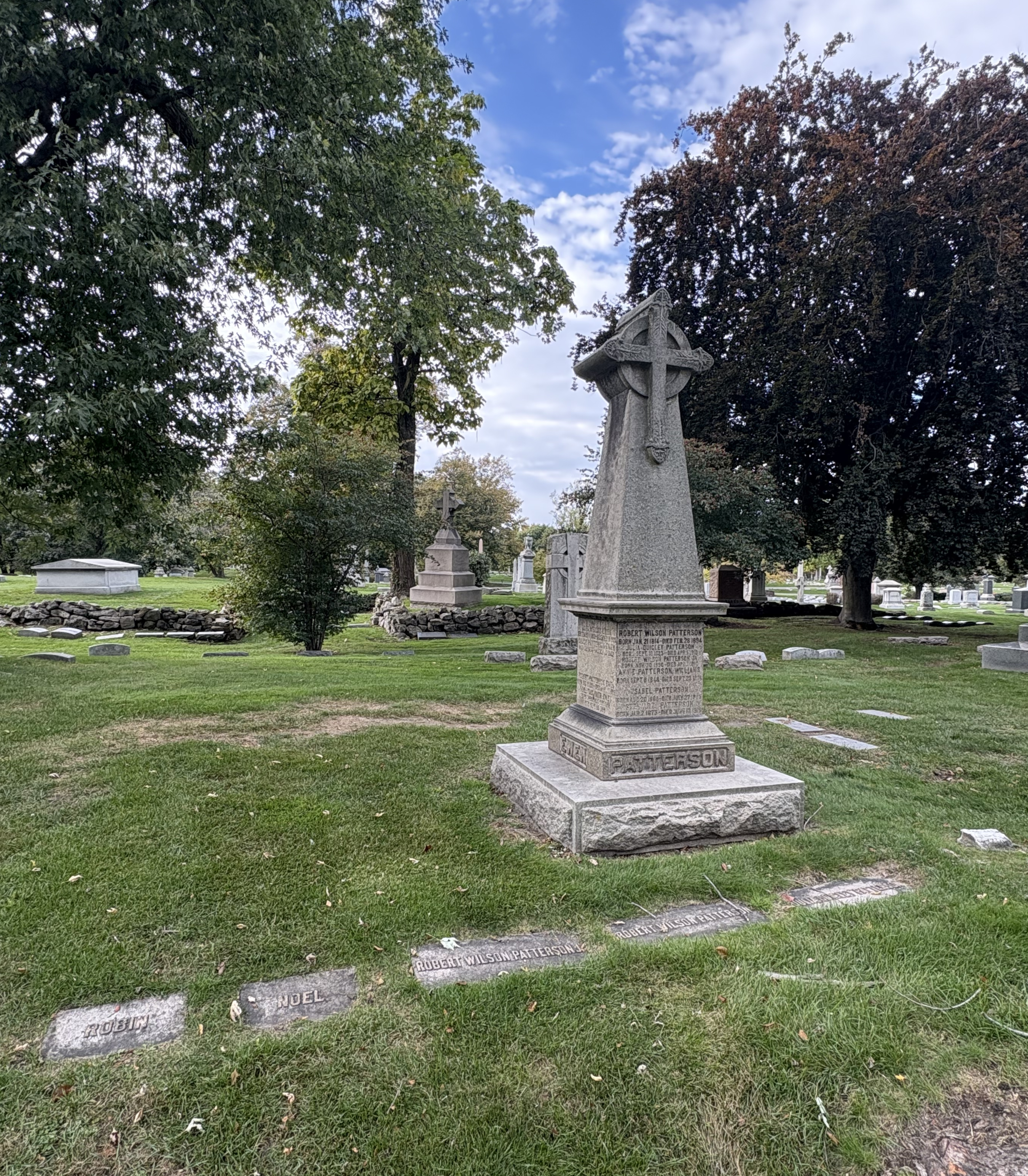
Patterson family plot at Graceland Cemetery

After the great fire in Chicago he became a reporter on the Times, later joined the staff of the Interior, and in 1873 became connected with the Chicago Tribune, of which he was successively assistant night editor, Washington correspondent, editorial writer, managing editor, and editor in chief. He was also president of the Chicago Tribune Company. Patterson lived in the Patterson Mansion, a Neoclassical 30-room home on Dupont Circle in Washington, D.C., where he entertained many prominent people of the day. He died of a stroke while at the Bellevue-Stratford Hotel in Philadelphia. He was buried at Graceland Cemetery in Chicago.

== Family tree ==
Medill Chicago family tree

Joseph Medill (1823–1899) | Katherine Patrick
Robert Wilson Patterson (1850–1910) | Elinor Medill (1855–1933) | Katherine van Etta Medill (1853–1932) | Robert Sanderson McCormick (1849–1919)
Joseph Medill Patterson (1879–1946) | Eleanor Josephine Medill Patterson (1884–1948) | Ruth Hanna (1880–1944) | Joseph Medill McCormick (1877–1925) | Robert Rutherford McCormick (1880–1955)
Alicia Patterson (1906–1963) | Harry Frank Guggenheim (1890–1971) | Jay Frederick Reeve (1893–1956) | Josephine Medill Patterson (1913–1996) | Ivan Le Lorraine Albright (1897–1983) | James Joseph Patterson (1923–1992)
Madeleine Jana Korbel (1937–2022) | Joseph Medill Patterson Reeve, later Albright (born 1937) | Alice Reeve, later Albright (1940–2016) | Michael J. Arlen (born 1930)
