= Joseph Albright (journalist) =

American journalist (born 1937)

- Born: Joseph Medill Patterson Reeve; April 3, 1937 (age 89); New Orleans, Louisiana, U.S.
- Education: Williams College
- Occupations: Journalist; author
- Spouses: Madeleine Korbel (m. 1959; div. 1982) Marcia Kunstel (m. 1983)
- Children: 3; including Alice
- Relatives: Alice Arlen (sister); Alicia Patterson (aunt); Harry F. Guggenheim (uncle); Joseph Medill Patterson (grandfather)

Joseph Medill Patterson Albright (né Reeve; born April 3, 1937) is an American journalist and author. A descendant of the Medill-Patterson media family, Albright wrote for the Chicago Sun-Times before becoming a reporter and executive at Newsday. He was later Washington and foreign correspondent for Cox Newspapers, receiving several journalism awards and nominations. Albright has authored three books; two with his wife, fellow reporter Marcia Kunstel. He was formerly married to Madeleine Korbel Albright, who later became the first female U.S. Secretary of State.

== Early life ==
Albright was born Joseph Medill Patterson Reeve in New Orleans, on April 3, 1937, to lawyer Jay Frederick "Fred" Reeve and his wife Josephine Medill Patterson, a reporter and airplane pilot. His younger sister Alice became a screenwriter. His parents divorced in 1944, and in 1946 Josephine married the painter Ivan Le Lorraine Albright. Ivan Albright adopted Joseph and Alice, who took his surname, and with Josephine had two more children, Adam and Blandina ("Dina"). Josephine chronicled young Joseph in a weekly New York Newsday column, "Life with Junior". He attended Groton School, Massachusetts, before studying at Williams College.

Albright is a scion of a newspaper empire: his grandfather and namesake Joseph Medill Patterson founded the New York Daily News, and his grand-aunt Eleanor "Cissy" Patterson published and edited the Washington Times-Herald. His great-great-grandfather, Joseph Medill, owned the Chicago Tribune and served as mayor of Chicago. Albright's aunt Alicia Patterson was founder and publisher of Newsday, and without children of her own, gave special attention to Joseph and Alice, expressing hope that one of them would succeed her as publisher when she retired.

== Career ==
Albright graduated from Williams College in 1958. During the summers of 1956 and 1957, he interned at the Denver Post, where he met fellow intern Madeleine Jana Korbel, whom he married on June 11, 1959. They had three daughters: twins Anne and Alice (born 1961) and Katie (born 1967), before divorcing in 1983. (Note: Joseph initiated a divorce and separation in January 1982, with the divorce finalized one year later.) He worked at the Chicago Sun-Times from 1958 to 1961 before joining Newsday in 1961. In 1963, after the death of his aunt Alicia, he became aide to the president and publisher, his uncle Harry F. Guggenheim. He worked in New York and later became chief of the Washington, D.C. bureau. He resigned from Newsday in early 1971, and worked as a legislative aide to Maine Senator Edmund Muskie from 1971 to 1972.

In 1972, he published a biography of vice president Spiro Agnew, What Makes Spiro Run. It was regarded as biased against Agnew, and a review in the Annals of the American Academy of Political and Social Science wrote Albright "leans so heavily on superficial commercial appeal that the book should be of little interest to serious political observers."

From 1972 to 1975, Albright was a correspondent for the San Francisco Chronicle. He became a correspondent for Cox Newspapers in 1976, and in 1983 married fellow Cox journalist Marcia Kunstel, with whom he reported from various foreign locales including South Africa, Afghanistan, Moscow, and Beijing. He was a finalist for the 1980 Pulitzer Prize for National Reporting for a series on gas and oil policy on public lands. Albright and fellow Cox journalist Cheryl Arvidson won the 1981 Raymond Clapper Memorial Award "...for their series, 'The Snub-Nosed Killers: Handguns in America.'" He and his wife shared a 1988 Overseas Press Club award for foreign reporting for their feature "Stolen Childhood: A Global Report on the Exploitation of Children" and a 1991 National Headliner Award from the Press Club of Atlantic City for their reporting on the leadup to the Gulf War.

In 1990, Albright and Kunstel co-authored Their Promised Land, an overview of the Israeli–Palestinian conflict as seen through the history of the Sorek Valley west of Jerusalem. Publishers Weekly called it: "vivid, observant, achingly poignant", and Kirkus Reviews called "a well-written and sweeping portrait of a troubled land." Political analyst Kathleen Christison wrote: "Uncompromising readers on either side will resent its neutrality. But the book is honest in its choice of historical source material and its treatment of the facts of Jewish-Arab conflict." A review in Newsweek noted that among the many books on the conflict, Kunstel's and Albright's "stands out for its thoughtfulness, its fairness and its excellent story."

In 1997, Albright and Kunstel published Bombshell: The Secret Story of America's Unknown Atomic Spy Conspiracy, focusing on American atomic spy Theodore Hall, and the married spy couple Morris and Lona Cohen. They supplement their research with interviews conducted with Hall, his wife, and others. Former CIA officer Frederick L. Wettering, reviewing for the International Journal of Intelligence and CounterIntelligence, called it "a well-researched and very well-written biography of a heretofore little known spy." Historian Gregg Herken noted it was the first book on Soviet atomic espionage to use archival sources from both Russia and the Venona project. A film adaptation was optioned to Universal Pictures, with Leonardo DiCaprio tapped to portray Hall.

Albright and Kunstel retired in 2000, and since 2001 have owned Flat Creek Ranch in Jackson Hole, Wyoming. Albright has served as chairman of the Alicia Patterson Foundation, vice-chairman of the Jackson Hole Conservation Alliance, and from 2009 to 2021 was on the board of trustees of St. John's Health in Jackson Hole. Kunstel has served on the governing council of The Wilderness Society since 2004.

== Bibliography ==
- What Makes Spiro Run: The Life and Times of Spiro Agnew (1972)
- Their Promised Land: Arab Versus Jew in History's Cauldron: One Valley in the Jerusalem Hills (1990). With Marcia Kunstel
- Bombshell: The Secret Story of America's Unknown Atomic Spy Conspiracy (1997). With Marcia Kunstel

== Family tree ==
Medill Chicago family tree

Joseph Medill (1823–1899)	Katherine Patrick
Robert Wilson Patterson (1850–1910)	Elinor Medill (1855–1933)	Katherine van Etta Medill (1853–1932)	Robert Sanderson McCormick (1849–1919)
Joseph Medill Patterson (1879–1946)	Eleanor Josephine Medill Patterson (1884–1948)	Ruth Hanna (1880–1944)	Joseph Medill McCormick (1877–1925)	Robert Rutherford McCormick (1880–1955)
Alicia Patterson (1906–1963)	Harry Frank Guggenheim (1890–1971)	Jay Frederick Reeve (1893–1956)	Josephine Medill Patterson (1913–1996)	Ivan Le Lorraine Albright (1897–1983)	James Joseph Patterson (1923–1992)
Madeleine Jana Korbel (1937–2022)	Joseph Medill Patterson Reeve, later Albright (born 1937)	Alice Reeve, later Albright (1940–2016)	Michael J. Arlen (born 1930)
