= Patterson Mansion =

Historic house in Washington, D.C.

- U.S. National Register of Historic Places
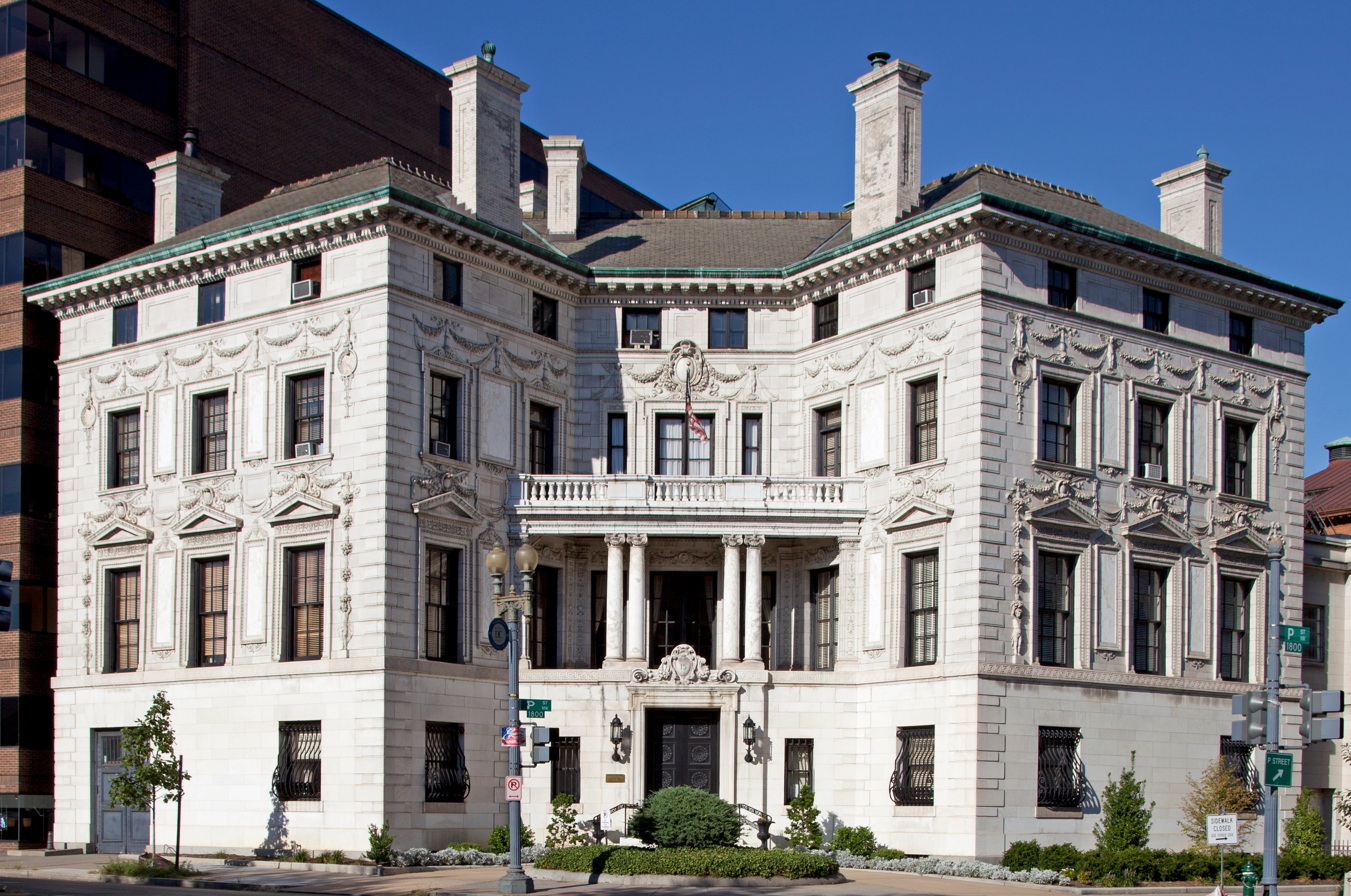

- Location within Washington, D.C.
- Location: 15 Dupont Circle NW; Washington, D.C., U.S.
- Coordinates: 38°54′36″N 77°2′33″W
- Built: 1903
- Architect: Stanford White
- Architectural style: Neoclassical
- NRHP reference No.: 72001438
- Added to NRHP: December 5, 1972

The Patterson Mansion (also known as the Patterson House or the Washington Club) is a historic Neoclassical-style mansion located at 15 Dupont Circle NW in Washington, D.C., United States.

It was built by Robert Wilson Patterson, editor of the Chicago Tribune newspaper, and used by him and his family for entertaining when he was in the city. Completed in 1903, it was deeded to the American Red Cross in 1948. The Red Cross sold it to the Washington Club in 1951. The structure was renovated and given a two-story addition in 1955. In June 2014, the Washington Club sold the mansion for $20 million to developer SB-Urban.

The mansion was added to the National Register of Historic Places on December 5, 1972, and is one of two remaining mansions on Dupont Circle, the other being the Wadsworth House. It is a contributing property to both the Dupont Circle Historic District (added to the National Register in 1978) and the Massachusetts Avenue Historic District (added to the National Register in 1974).

== History ==
=== The Dupont Circle site ===
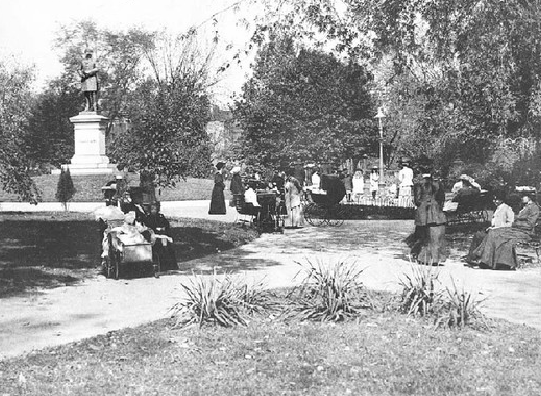
Dupont Circle in 1900.

The traffic circle that became Dupont Circle was first envisioned in 1791 by the L'Enfant Plan that established the route of Massachusetts Avenue NW. Much of the street passed through marshy areas that restricted development, including the area around Dupont Circle. After the American Civil War, several large mansions were built around the circle, where much of the area was still forested and afforded privacy.

Major development began around Dupont Circle in 1871, when a group of mine owners from the western United States, led by Curtis J. Hillyer and Senator William Morris Stewart, purchased $600,000 of nearby land. A large number of palatial residences, including Stewart's Castle, were soon constructed on and around the circle. In response to demands by this politically influential group, the city made major improvements to Massachusetts and Connecticut Avenue NW. The traffic circle itself, which had been enclosed by a rough wooden fence since the 1860s, was landscaped, pedestrian paths laid, and drinking fountains and gas street lighting added. Known as "Pacific Circle", it was renamed Dupont Circle in 1882 when the site was chosen for a statue to Admiral Samuel Francis Du Pont that was erected in 1884.

=== Building the house ===
On March 30, 1900, Robert Wilson Patterson's wife, Elinor "Nellie" Medill Patterson, purchased the lot at 15 Dupont Circle for $83,406 ($2,988,715 in 2025 dollars) from a Mrs. Anna Howell Stewart. Mrs. Patterson hired the architect Stanford White, who designed the Pattersons' home in Chicago, to develop plans for the house. They were finalized in April 1901, with a projected cost of $85,000 ($3,045,833 in 2025 dollars). The George A. Fuller Company began construction in June 1901. The home was nearly completed 18 months later. But on November 15, 1902, four days before her son Joseph's wedding to Alice Higinbotham, paint cans in the attic of the north wing of the house caught fire. Although the house suffered fire and water damage, it was repaired and the entire structure house completed by January 1903. The final cost of construction was $200,000 ($7,166,667 in 2025 dollars).

=== Patterson years ===
Ca. 1905 photo of the house, looking north from Connecticut Avenue NW

The Pattersons moved into the home in January 1903. They held the first party to which large members of the public were invited in February 1904, when Nellie Patterson hosted a gigantic cotillion ball for social debut of her daughter, Eleanor Josephine Medill "Cissy" Patterson.

Until 1922, Nellie Patterson kept a full staff of about 10 to 15 servants, dressed in livery, to provide services to the family and guests at the Patterson Mansion. Her husband, Robert Wilson Patterson, died in 1910.

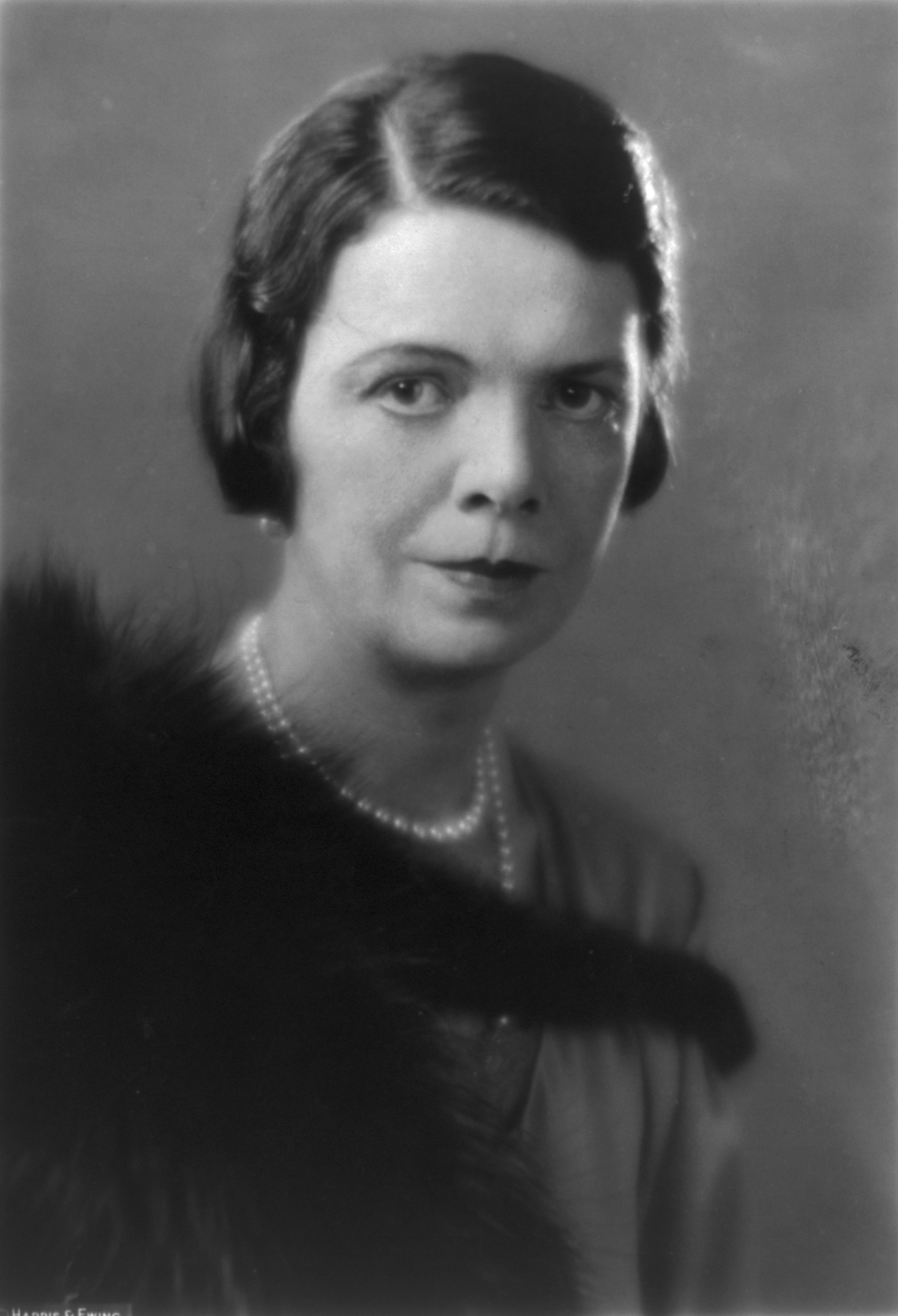
Cissy Patterson

Nellie Patterson spent less and less time in the Dupont Circle mansion over the years, preferring her long-time home in Chicago. She became morbidly obese, then suffered a heart attack and lost weight. In September 1922, Cissy Patterson (herself spending more time at her other homes and abroad) allowed her daughter, Felicia, and her new husband, Drew Pearson, to take up residence in the mansion. Nellie Patterson vacated 15 Dupont Circle for good in 1923, never to return, and deeded the property to Cissy that same year. Although Cissy formally took up residence there in 1923, she spent most of her time elsewhere. The house was barely occupied from 1923 to 1929, as the Pearsons left for Asia in 1925 and never returned to the home. Cissy Patterson's divorce from her first husband, Count Josef Gizycki, was finalized in 1917. She married New York City lawyer Elmer Schlesinger in 1925, but used the mansion little in the years afterward.

The Patterson Mansion was the home of President Calvin Coolidge and his wife, Grace Coolidge in 1927. The White House needed extensive renovation which rendered it unliveable while construction occurred. In February 1927, Cissy Patterson offered them the use of her empty home. The Coolidges stayed in the house from March 4, 1927, to June 13, 1927, after which they left for an extended vacation in the Black Hills of South Dakota. Mrs. Coolidge found the rooms, which slanted slightly due to the odd shape of the lot, cramped. She felt the house was far better designed when it came to entertaining.

From June 10 to June 12, 1927, Charles Lindbergh was a guest of the Coolidges at the Patterson Mansion upon his triumphant return from France after his non-stop flight across the Atlantic Ocean piloting the aircraft Spirit of St. Louis. Lindbergh's mother, Evangeline Lodge Land Lindbergh, also stayed in the mansion during this time. The house was besieged by crowds every day he spent in the nation's capital. On June 11, Lindbergh appeared three times at the second floor balcony to wave and briefly speak to the crowd. Some of the most iconic photos of Lindbergh were taken during his balcony appearances.

After Cissy Patterson reoccupied the mansion full-time in 1929, it became a center of social life in Washington, D.C. The home was decorated in Patterson's unique style. This included the heads and pelts of 13 big-game animals (deer, moose, mountain lion, and mountain goat, and others) hanging on the walls of the main staircase. The ballroom was decorated in the Louis Quinze style, with a life-size portrait of Nellie Patterson and furniture in blue, pink, and white colors. The walls of the second floor dining room were painted a deep red, and the furniture was mahogany. The second floor library was lined with bookcases and decorated with Chinese artwork. In front of each bedroom suite fireplace on the third and fourth floors were an animal skin rug. The second floor bedroom suite in the northeast corner of the house was painted in red.

Cissy Patterson originally willed the house to her daughter, Felicia. But after a family argument in 1942, Cissy changed her will and asked that the mansion be donated to the League of Republican Women of the District of Columbia. She changed her mind again in 1946 and left it to the American Red Cross.

=== Post-Patterson owners ===
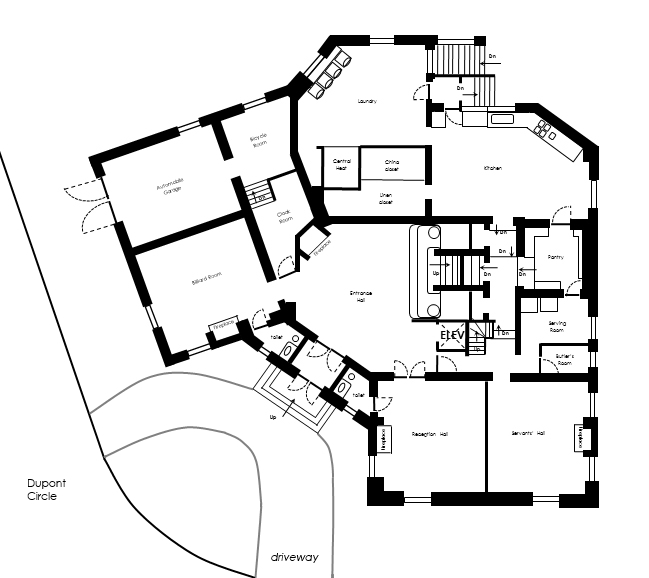
Original plan for the ground floor.

Cissy Patterson died on July 24, 1948. Her will donated the building and most of its furnishings to the American Red Cross (ARC). (Family portraits and silverware were not included.) Cissy's daughter, Felicia Gizycka (who had divorced Pearson and taken her father's last name), received an income of $25,000 a year; a house and property in Port Washington, New York; property in North Dakota; and a substantial amount of jewelry, paintings, furnishings, and family heirlooms.

Felicia Gizycka challenged the will on September 13, 1948. Gizycka claimed it was not the last will signed by her mother, that Cissy was of unsound mind and under undue influence, and that the witnesses had not signed the will correctly. Over the next few months, the case took a number of twists and turns, including the suicide of a former beneficiary, an alleged break-in at the Gizycka home, and a number of accusations made by both sides in the dispute. Seven previous wills and two current codicils were discovered. The existence of so many other wills (all of which pre-dated the 1946 will), none of which substantially benefitted Felicia Gizycka, led to extensive legal maneuvers. A trial was set for January 18, 1949, and then moved to February 9. On January 28, 1949, a settlement in the case was reached by the parties. Under the new agreement, Felicia Gizycka received $400,000 from the estate (with the heavy state and federal inheritance and income taxes paid by the estate), along with the New York and North Dakota properties. In return, she gave up the right to inherit personal property, which would be used to help pay taxes. The settlement did not disturb the provisions of the will donating the Patterson Mansion and its contents to the Red Cross, but did allow the will to be probated and the deed transferred.

The Red Cross, however, had no use for the Patterson Mansion. The organization had a magnificent structure, the Neoclassical American Red Cross National Headquarters at 430 17th Street NW (completed in 1917), which served as its national headquarters. Furthermore, on July 1, 1947, Congress enacted legislation (P.L. 100-637) donating federal land along the north side of E Street NW between 20th and 21st Streets for a new District of Columbia Chapter headquarters. The national organization had already committed $700,000 to build this structure.

The Red Cross decided to sell the mansion instead. It opened the house to the public in April 1949 to build public interest in a forthcoming auction of the home's many furnishings. The auction raised little interest. The Red Cross put the building and its furnishings up for sale in November 1949 with a $700,000 asking price ($9,472,028 in 2025 dollars).

The property lingered on the market until the Washington Club, a private women's club, bought the Patterson Mansion on January 11, 1951. The purchase price was not immediately disclosed, but later was discovered to be just $450,000 ($5,581,731 in 2025 dollars). After a title search was completed, the deed transferred on March 1, 1951. Included among the furnishings in the home were several Gobelins, Flemish, and French tapestries and a large amount of period furniture. After some renovations to bring the structure in line with current fire codes, the Washington Club occupied the building on November 8, 1951. The club rented out the second and third floor bedrooms and their associated suites of rooms to club members. The third reception room, once Felicia Gizycka's bedroom and known as the Countess Room, was renamed the "Dorothy Betts Marvin Room" in honor of Washington Club president Dorothy Marvin, wife of George Washington University president Cloyd H. Marvin.

In 1956, the Washington Club constructed a two-story addition on the east side of the Patterson Mansion. The windows on the first and second floor on the east side were walled up, and three new doors cut on the first floor to provide access to the addition. Two doors were cut on the second floor. A butler's pantry, kitchen prep area, toilet, elevator entrance hall, and banquet hall were built on the ground floor. Stairwells were added on the four corners of the addition. A reception room and small toilet were constructed on the south end of the second of the addition, while a large auditorium occupied the central section. A stage, dressing rooms, and storage area were built on the north end of the second floor.

=== 2013 sale ===
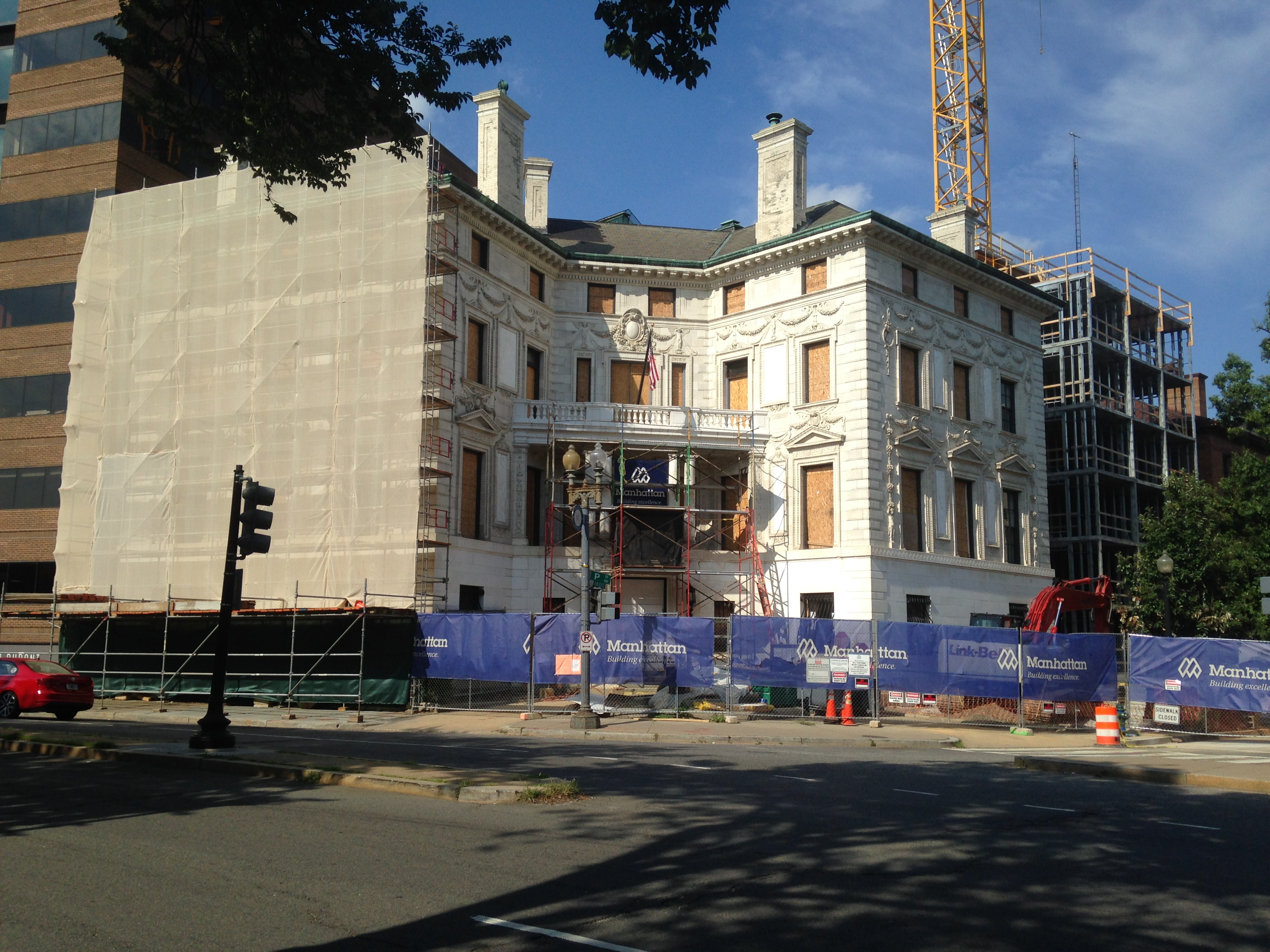
Patterson Mansion being converted into apartments in 2016.

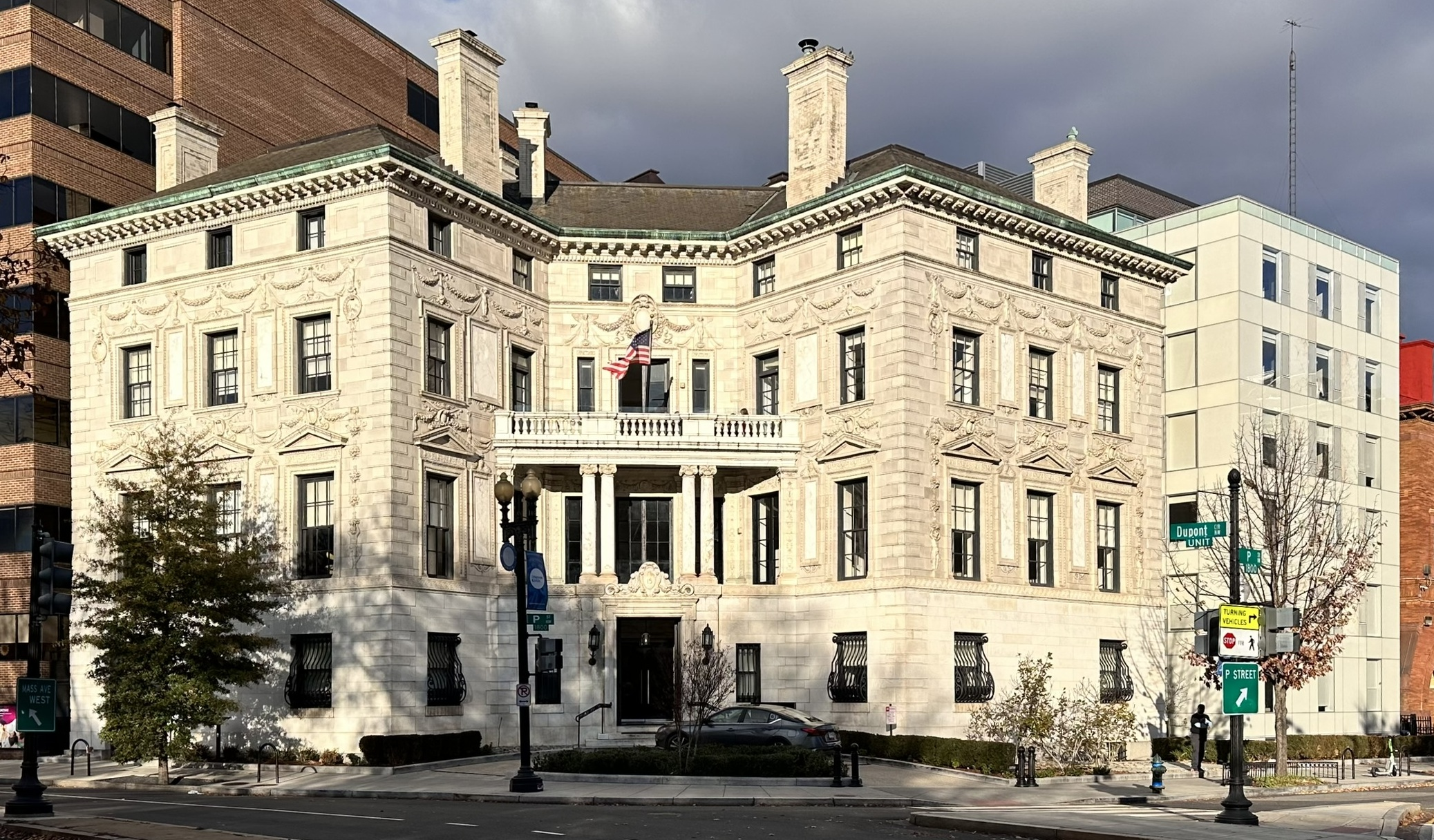
Oakwood Suites & Studios in 2023

In the summer of 2013, the Washington Club put the Patterson Mansion up for sale, asking $26 million. John Matteo, the club's attorney at Jackson & Campbell, said the club was disbanding and no longer needed the space.

French Quarter Hospitality agreed to purchase the property on October 20, 2013, provided it won approval for renovation and expansion of the property from relevant local government authorities. French Quarter hired Studio 3877 Architects to design a six-story addition to wrap around the rear of the structure. The lower floors of this addition were taller than the upper floors, and it would be attached to the mansion itself. The company planned to turn the mansion's first two floors into a bar, lounges, and a restaurant, and the two upper floors to become hotel rooms. The company said it would tear down the 1956 addition. Historic preservationists applauded the move, which would have preserved the original floor plan and opened up much of the historic mansion to the public.

The District of Columbia Historic Preservation Review Board ruled on November 9, 2013, that the original mansion was historic, but declined to give historic protection to the 1956 addition, removing a major obstacle to its demolition. But the board denied approval for the proposed six-story addition, saying it would destroy the historic character of the mansion. Consequently, French Quarter pulled out of the deal in December.

In February 2014, real estate developer SB-Urban agreed to buy the Patterson Mansion if the city approved its plan to subdivide the structure into "micro-unit" apartments (units 400 square feet (37 m^{2}) or smaller). The building's ballrooms and other spaces would become common areas. SB-Urban said it, too, wanted to tear down the non-historic addition. It proposed a seven-story new addition as well, but its addition would have uniform floors and be distant enough from the mansion that there would a "visual separation" from it. The Historic Preservation Review Board approved SB-Urban's design for an eight-story addition in late February 2014 after finding that revised designs provided enough visual distinction with the existing building. SB-Urban obtained a $31 million investment from CBD LLC, a District-based real estate investment firm, in August 2015. The two companies, which formed a joint venture to renovate the mansion, said they planned 92 mini-apartments for the site, with shared living space, an on-site chef providing meals, meeting space, a private wine cellar, and a fully staffed private bar in the mansion's ballroom. Hartman-Cox Architects is designing the renovation and addition.

The Ampeer Dupont Circle apartments opened in 2017. In 2020, Oakwood was appointed as management company; the following year, the property was rebranded as Oakwood Suites & Studios Dupont Circle Washington DC. The property includes 92 residential apartments fitted with kitchens and washer/dryers for long-term leasing and hotel accommodations suited for short and extended stays. It also includes a social kitchen, ballroom, and library.

== About the building ==
=== The exterior ===
The mansion is in the Neoclassical style, with exterior Italianate decorative motifs. Some sources call it Italianate in style rather than Neoclassical.

The building is set on a polygonal lot. It is 128 feet 10 inches (39.27 m) on the P Street (south) side, 64 feet 6 inches (19.66 m) on the curved Dupont Circle side (southwest), 164 feet 9 inches (50.22 m) on the northwest side, and 132 feet 9 inches (40.46 m) on the east side. The building faces southwest, and a semi-elliptical concrete driveway connects P Street and Dupont Circle to provide access to the main entrance. The driveway creates a small forecourt.

The building is four stories high, with a basement. It is 60 feet (18 m) high from sidewalk to roof ridgeline. The main entrance is set back from the southwest corner, at an obtuse angle. It is a loggia one bay wide and 8 feet (2.4 m) deep. The Dupont Circle and P Street sides are both three bays wide and 39 feet (12 m) in length. The east wall is 83 feet (25 m) in length. The rest of the building consists of walls set at an obtuse angle, perpendicular, or parallel to an east–west axis. The foundations consist of concrete footings and slab.

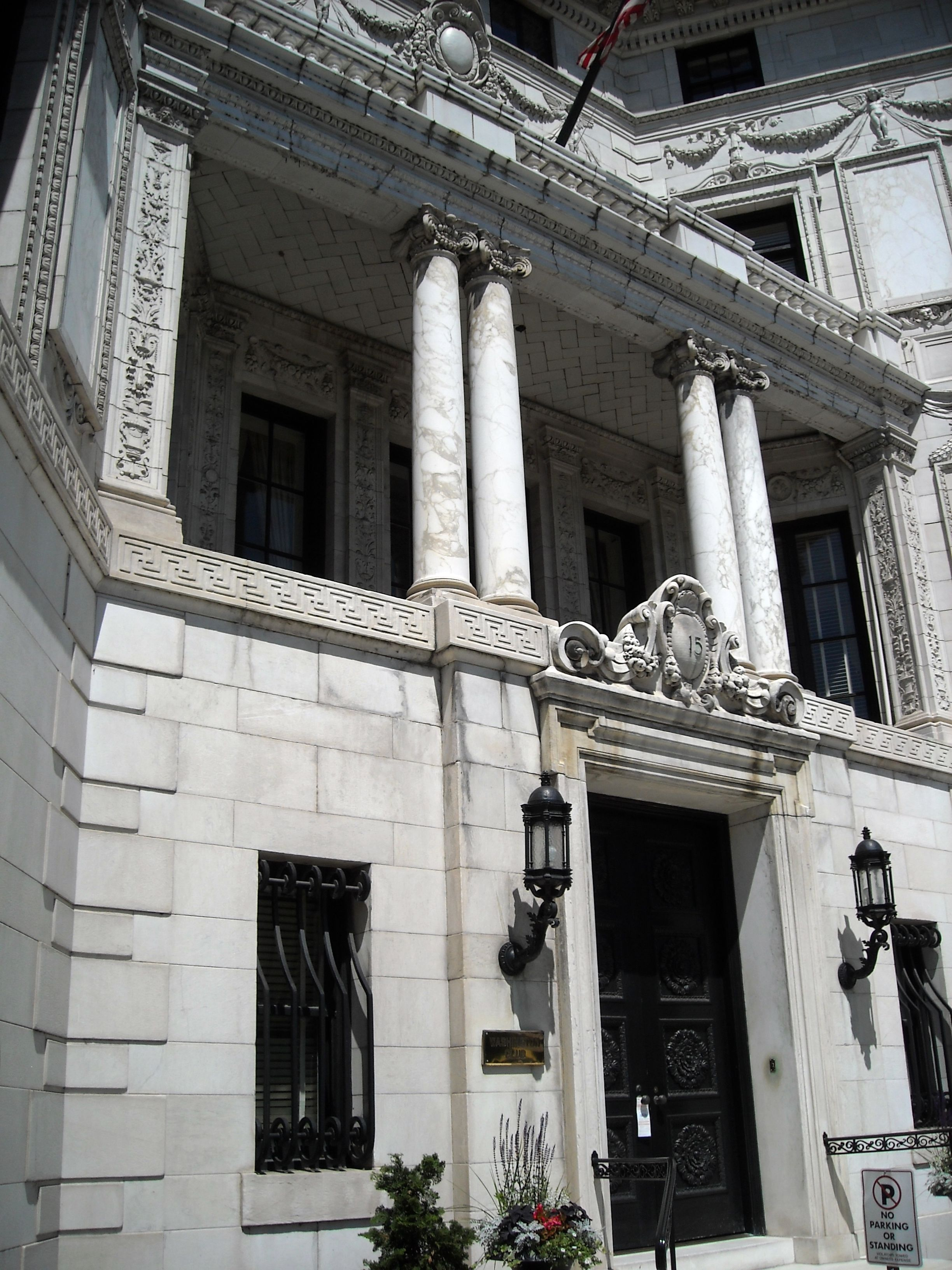
The ornate entrance and second floor balcony of the Patterson Mansion in 2008.

The first floor exterior wall consists of limestone quoins at the corner and stone coursing. A string course with Greek decorative carving is set between the first and second floors, and acts as the window sill for the second floor windows and as the balustrade for the entrance loggia. The second and third floor exterior walls have stone quoins as well. Between each window on the second floor is a panel inlaid with variegated marble and surrounded by egg-and-dart moldings. The base of the panel is decorated with scrollwork, and the top by a bas-relief urn. Five fruit-shaped clusters decorate the outside frame of the furthermost window on this floor (the lowest cluster supported by a tiny putto), while above each window is a false pediment topped by an escutcheon flanked by drapery. Variegated marble panels are set between each window on the third floor as well, the bottom of each decorated with scrollwork and a small dramatic mask. The sill of each third floor window is of scrollwork, while the window is topped by scrollwork and a torch. Circular medallions with pendants decorate the outside frame of the furthermost window on the third floor. A bas-relief putto stands atop each medallion and panel, supporting fruit swags. Between the third and fourth (or attic) floors is a molding decorated with repetitive small eggs which serves as the sill for the fourth floor windows. The truncated hipped roof slightly overhangs the walls. The cornice is decorated with dentils and acanthus carvings beneath the roofline. The roof, originally red tile, was changed at some point to asbestos roof shingles with copper flashing. There are seven chimneys on the roof, and about five skylights on the flat section.

The entrance is reached by three limestone steps. The architrave of the entrance loggia is topped by a fruit-and-swag draped escutcheon. Smooth, variegated marble double-columns, topped by composite capitals, stand above the architrave. The entrance originally featured French doors, but were replaced by black enameled doors decorative by bas-relief wreaths.

The second-floor balcony is framed on either end by pilasters decorated with candelabra. Each wall is angled inward by two bays, with one of the bays behind the balustrade. It is reached via French doors which are framed by slit windows on either side. Pilasters decorated with candelabra are set between the four windows and the doors. A circular escutcheon framed with fruit-and-drapery swags tops each bay and the French doors, while fruit-and-drapery swags link the pilasters over the slit windows.

The third floor balcony is reached through French doors (framed with slit windows) as well. It features a low balustrade of turned granite interrupted by pedestals, which are decorated with variegated marble panels. The placement of the pedestals mimics the pillars and pilasters below. The two bay windows on either side of the balcony feature the same torches, swag, putti, panels, and molding similar to the rest of the third floor. Above the French doors is a large oval escutcheon with fruit-and-drapery swag which mimics the escutcheon over the doors to the loggia. A standing putto over each slit window supports the swag.

All exterior walls are faced with white marble over stone. All windows are double-hung. The first floor windows feature black wrought iron grillwork. The fourth floor windows have no decorative exterior elements.

=== The interior: First floor ===
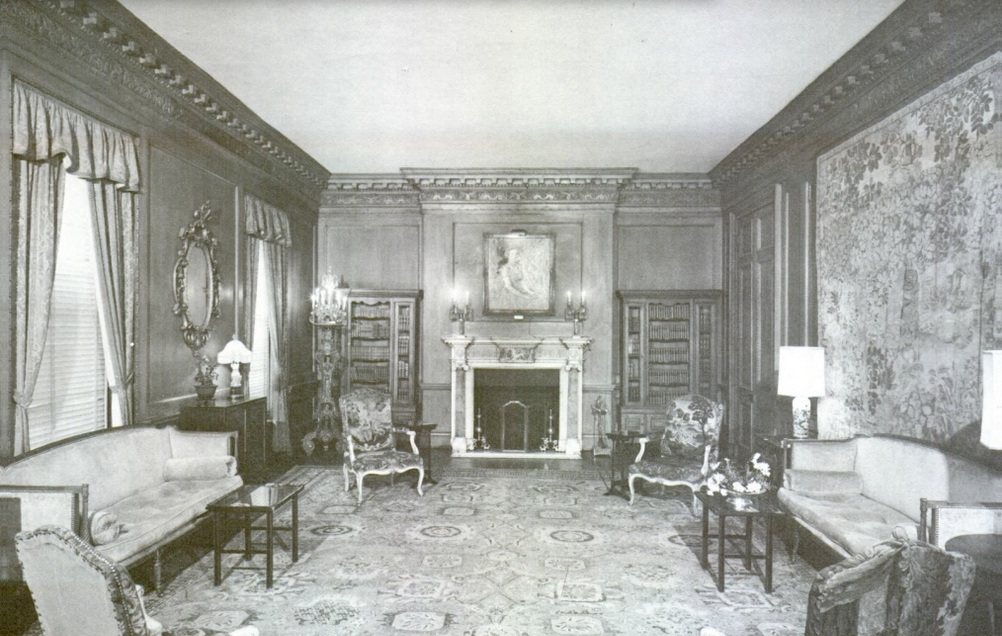
Looking northwest at the second floor library (now a sitting room) of the Patterson Mansion in 1970.

The interior is constructed of load-bearing brick walls. The lighting is electric, and the heating system is gravity-rise.

The northwest wing was angled to align with Dupont Circle, while the rest of the house (south wing, center, northeast wing) was on a north–south axis perpendicular to P Street NW. The vestibule behind the loggia was on a northeast–southwest axis, and flanked on both sides by toilets—one of which was accessible by the billiard room to the northwest and the other by the reception hall to the southeast. The entrance hall was floored with polished terrazzo bordered by white marble. The ceiling was white plaster, and the walls were white plaster with a 6-inch (15 cm) high wooden baseboard. The billiard room was access by a door in the west wall, and in the north-northwest corner was a door leading to a cloakroom. To the right of the cloakroom door is a fireplace framed by exquisite moldings and a mantelpiece in the 15th-century Italian style. In the south wall, a door gave entry to the reception hall. Two marble steps led to a small landing and then the main staircase in the east wall (northeast corner). Adjacent to the main staircase to the right (south) was the elevator, and then a small door and corridor giving onto the servants' section in the rear of the mansion's first floor. Northwest of the billiard room was an automobile garage, with the garage door giving onto Dupont Circle. Northeast of the garage, and connected to the garage and the cloakroom, was a bicycle storage room. In the rear of the ground floor was the servants' area. Clockwise from the north, this consisted of the laundry and storage closets, servants' entrance, kitchen, pantry, serving room, butler's room, and servants' hall. A set of winder stairs behind the elevator serves as the servants' stairs.

The first floor reception hall had white plaster walls and ceiling, carpeted floors, and a 6-inch (15 cm) high wooden baseboard. A fireplace existed in the west wall.

The billiard was similar to the reception hall, although it featured a dado rail 2 feet 6 inches (0.76 m) off the floor. Its walls were wood paneling (into which built-in bookcases were added after 1951). It featured a chimney in the south wall. This fireplace was much plainer than those in the rest of the house, and its mantel consisted of a sand-cast concrete mantel in the Georgian style.

The mainstaircase was flanked by smooth, variegated marble columns in antis. Ten marble steps lead up to a landing. In the east wall of the intermediate landing is a fountain. The stairs diverge at the intermediate landing, with nine more steps on the north and south leading to the second floor landing. The stringer, risers, and treads are all made of marble. The banister is of cast iron in a rinceau and cartouche pattern, with a handrail encased in red velvet.

The staircase fountain is made of white marble with grey and tan veins. The semi-circular bowl is supported by an eagle with outspread wings. Water pours from the mouth of a faun, above which is perched a swan in bas-relief. Decorated pilasters on either side of the fountain support a plain frieze, above which is an inset fan capped by an acroterion.

=== The interior: Second floor ===
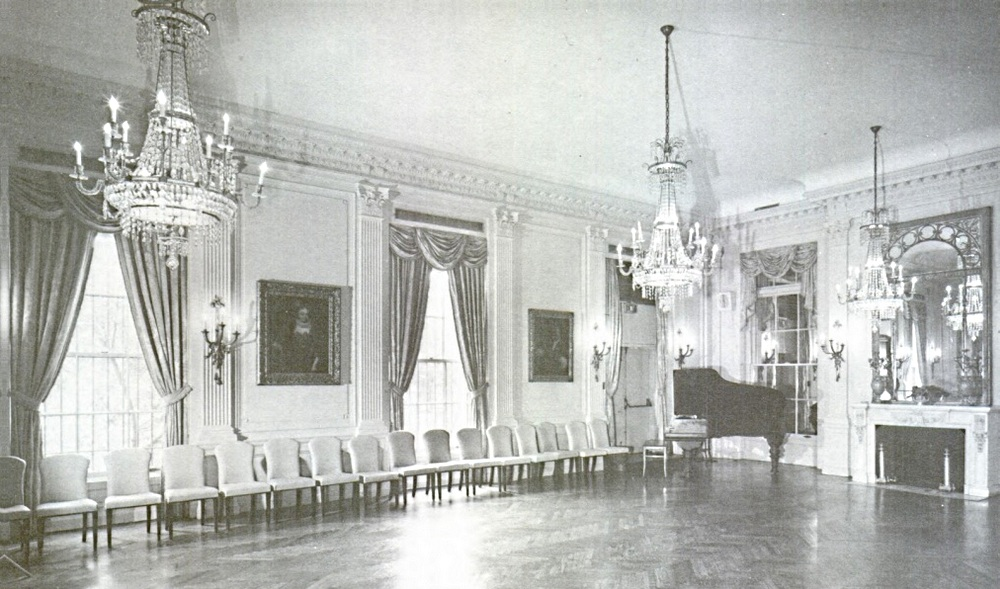
Looking northeast at the ballroom of the Patterson Mansion in 1970.

The second floor layout is much simpler than the first floor. Ceilings throughout the floor are 12-foot-4-inch (3.76 m) high. The main staircase led to a foyer with a wood parquet floor in a herringbone pattern. The walls were plaster panels, separated by fluted marble pilasters on wood pedestals. The ceiling is white plaster with decorative moldings.

In the northwest corner was the library, accessed by double-panel wood doors with carved wood moldings around it. The flooring was similar to that of the foyer, and the ceiling of plaster. The walls were plaster, with a 7.5 inches (19 cm) wooden baseboard and a dado rail at 3 feet (0.91 m). The room was originally lined with bookcases. A fireplace with marble hearth and mantel, surrounded by exquisite marble and plaster moldings, was in the northwest wall.

In the foyer, to the right of the door leading to the library, was a set of plain marble stairs with an intermediate landing and single turn which lead to the third floor. Behind the steps was a conservatory with a bay window facing northwest. From the intermediate landing, a door in the northeast wall gave out onto an orchestra balcony overlooking the ballroom. The base of the balcony is decorated with corbels, plaster drapery, and guttae.

The ballroom occupied the entire north wing. It was accessed via the foyer through glass doors. The ballroom ceiling was plaster. Its flooring was oak parquetry in a herringbone pattern with plaster walls, a 6 inches (15 cm) wooden baseboard, and a dado rail at 3 feet (0.91 m). Flanking the doors, chimney, and windows and in the corners of the room were marble pilasters on wooden pedestals. The west wall was bowed westward, to accommodate the orchestra balcony as it projected into the room. The room was lit by 10 brass wall sconces with three upward curving torch-arms. Hanging from the ceiling were three, 12-light crystal chandeliers with three hidden tiers. The fireplace in the east wall featured a cast iron firebox, framed by marble pilasters. It had a marble mantel, and a mirror overmantel in an 18th-century English style.

Behind the main stairs was a shaft, allowing the skylight to shine down to the first floor, and another butler's pantry.

A dining room occupied the south part of the second floor. Its flooring consisted of 6 by 6 inches (15 by 15 cm) square flame maple wood parquetry, with a 5.5 inches (14 cm) wooden baseboard, and a dado rail at 3 feet (0.91 m). Its walls and ceiling were plaster, with a decorative molding around the ceiling. The doors were similar to those of the library, and in the east wall was a fireplace with iron firebox and marble mantel in the Georgian style. The room was lit by six mirror-backed crystal wall sconces with three crystal torch-arms. A single 12-light crystal chandelier with two hidden light tiers and an elaborate brass canopy hung from the ceiling.

=== The interior: Third and fourth floors ===
Bedroom suites occupied the second and third floors. Each suite consisted of a bedroom, dressing room, and bathroom. There were three suites on the third floor, and one on the fourth floor.

=== Changes to the original building ===
The building has undergone modest internal changes since its construction. Almost all previous owners have made changes.

In 1927, the Washington Post reported that the house had 30 rooms and 10 bathrooms. This does not appear to have changed by the time of Cissy Patterson's death, as there were still 40 rooms in 1948. Although the northeast room on the first floor was originally a billiard room, by 1927 Cissy Patterson had changed it into a small library. Cissy Patterson's changes also include extending the wine cellar outward beneath the driveway by a distance of 10 feet (3.0 m) in 1917. In March 1935, she hired the Otis Elevator Company to install an elevator and had the electrical power switched to AC from DC.

The Washington Club also made many changes to the house. Renovations included adding new doors, removing old doors to create portals, and new wiring, plumbing, plastering, and carpeting. In order to allow club members to use the upper bedrooms as private apartments, the staircase from the second floor foyer to the third floor was partitioned off. An exterior concrete stair leading from the former conservatory to the ground floor (for use as a fire escape) was also added. The garage was partitioned, an elevator added just inside the garage doors, and toilets added against the shared wall with the first floor billiard room (which now became the library). The first floor servants' hall was partitioned as well to create an office and corridor. The second floor library was turned into a drawing room and its plaster walls covered over with walnut paneling. Felicia Grizycka's bedroom suite on third floor was turned into reception/board room.

Most significantly, the Washington Club closed off all the east wall windows on first and second floors. A two-story addition was constructed on the east side in 1956. New doors were cut through the walls on the first floor from the servants' hall and kitchen, and the east wall of the pantry removed to provide access to the addition. On the second floor, new doors were cut from the butler's pantry and south of the fireplace in the ballroom. Another door was cut in the north wall near the northeastern corner to provide access to a new exterior concrete fire escape stairs. A dining room and foyer were constructed on the first floor of the addition, and a meeting room and reception room on second floor.

The Washington Club did not, however, alter the main marble staircase, its wrought iron balustrade with red velvet banister, or the fountain on intermediate landing between the first and second floors.

The Patterson Mansion was renovated again in 1985. The renovation was overseen by Oerhlein & Associates Architects.

In 2015, SB-Urban and Rooney Properties joined forces to renovate and expand the Patterson House and turn it into 92 apartment units. Manhattan Construction Company is the project's general contractor. Hartman-Cox Architects is the architect, with Darryl Carter Inc. as interior designer.

== Bibliography ==
- Dickey, Jeff. The Rough Guide to Washington, D.C. London: Rough Guides, 2011.
- Gould, Lewis L. American First Ladies: Their Lives and Their Legacy. Florence, Ky.: Taylor & Francis, 2001.
- Green, Constance McLaughlin. Washington: Village and Capital, 1800-1878. Princeton, N.J.: Princeton University Press, 1962.
- Healy, Paul F. Cissy: The Biography of Eleanor M. "Cissy" Patterson. Garden City, N.Y.: Doubleday, 1966.
- Hogarth, Paul. Walking Tours of Old Washington and Alexandria. McLean, Va.: EPM Publications, 1985.
- Hoge, Alice Albright (1966). Cissy Patterson. New York: Random House.
- Jennings, James Longstreet Sibley; Kohler, Sue A.; and Carson, Jeffrey R. Massachusetts Avenue Architecture. Washington, D.C.: U.S. Commission of Fine Arts, 1973.
- Moeller, Gerard Martin and Feldblyum, Boris. AIA Guide to the Architecture of Washington, D.C. Baltimore, Md.: Johns Hopkins University Press, 2012.
- Ross, Ishbel. Grace Coolidge and Her Era: The Story of a President's Wife. New York: Dodd, Mead, 1962.
- Smith, Amanda. Newspaper Titan: The Infamous Life and Monumental Times of Cissy Patterson. New York: Alfred A. Knopf, 2011.
- Washington, D.C. '96: The Complete Guide with Monuments, Museums, Arlington, Annapolis and Best Bets For Kids. New York: Fodor's Travel Publications, 1995.
- Williams, Paul Kelsey. Dupont Circle. Charleston, S.C.: Arcadia, 2000.
