= Alice Arlen =

American screenwriter and producer (1940-2016)

- Alice Arlen
- Born: Alice Reeve; November 6, 1940; Chicago, Illinois, U.S.
- Died: February 29, 2016 (aged 75); New York, New York, U.S.
- Other names: Alice Albright, Alice Albright Hoge
- Education: Harvard University, Columbia University
- Occupations: Screenwriter, producer
- Spouses: James Hoge (m. 1962; div. 1971) Michael J. Arlen (m. 1972)
- Children: 3
- Parents: Jay Reeve (biological), Ivan Albright (adoptive) (father); Josephine Medill Patterson (mother)
- Relatives: Joseph Albright (brother)

Alice Arlen (November 6, 1940 – February 29, 2016) was an American screenwriter, best known for Silkwood (1983), which she wrote with Nora Ephron. Her other film credits include the scripts of Alamo Bay (1985), Cookie (1989), The Weight of Water (2000) and Then She Found Me (2007).

== Early life ==
In 1940, Arlen was born as Alice Reeve. Arlen's father was Jay Frederick Reeve, a lawyer. Arlen's mother was Josephine Medill Patterson, a journalist. After Arlen's mother married Ivan Albright, Arlen and her brother Joseph took the surname of Albright.

== Education ==
In 1962, Arlene graduated from Radcliffe College of Harvard University. In 1981, Arlene earned an MFA degree from the Columbia University School of the Arts.

== Career ==
Arlen worked for CBS. Arlen met Nora Ephron, with whom she wrote the screenplay for Silkwood (1983), for which they were nominated for an Oscar for Best Original Screenplay. Arlen worked with director Louis Malle, writing the script for Alamo Bay (1985). Arlen and Ephron later worked together on Cookie (1989), which was directed by Susan Seidelman. Later, Arlen also wrote the screenplay for The Weight of Water (2000), and Helen Hunt's first feature film as director, Then She Found Me (2007).

== Filmography ==
- Silkwood (with Nora Ephron) (1983)
- Alamo Bay (1985)
- Cookie (with Nora Ephron) (1989) (also Executive Producer)
- A Shock to the System (Associate Producer) (1990)
- The Weight of Water (with Christopher Kyle) (2000)
- A Thief of Time (2004) (TV)
- Then She Found Me (with Victor Levin and Helen Hunt) (2007)

== Personal life ==
Arlen married James Hoge. They had three children. In 1971, Arlen divorced. In 1972, Arlen married Michael J. Arlen and later moved to New York.

In 2016, Arlen died at her home in Manhattan, New York. She was 75 years old.

== Family tree ==
Medill Chicago family tree

Joseph Medill (1823–1899)	Katherine Patrick
Robert Wilson Patterson (1850–1910)	Elinor Medill (1855–1933)	Katherine van Etta Medill (1853–1932)	Robert Sanderson McCormick (1849–1919)
Joseph Medill Patterson (1879–1946)	Eleanor Josephine Medill Patterson (1884–1948)	Ruth Hanna (1880–1944)	Joseph Medill McCormick (1877–1925)	Robert Rutherford McCormick (1880–1955)
Alicia Patterson (1906–1963)	Harry Frank Guggenheim (1890–1971)	Jay Frederick Reeve (1893–1956)	Josephine Medill Patterson (1913–1996)	Ivan Le Lorraine Albright (1897–1983)	James Joseph Patterson (1923–1992)
Madeleine Jana Korbel (1937–2022)	Joseph Medill Patterson Reeve, later Albright (born 1937)	Alice Reeve, later Albright (1940–2016)	Michael J. Arlen (born 1930)
