= Flat Creek Ranch =

- U.S. National Register of Historic Places
- Location within Wyoming Location within the United States
- Location: Jackson Hole, Teton County, Wyoming, USA
- Nearest city: Jackson, Wyoming
- Coordinates: 43°31′40″N 110°32′33″W
- Built: 1923
- Architect: Charles Fox
- NRHP reference No.: 01001428
- Added to NRHP: December 31, 2001

Flat Creek Ranch, formerly a working ranch in Jackson Hole, Wyoming, is a guest ranch. The original ranch was established by Cal Carrington between 1901 and 1918 at the base of Sheep Mountain, also known as the "Sleeping Indian". In 1923 a new owner, socialite and journalist Cissy Patterson, built the present structures. The transition from working ranch to vacation retreat foreshadowed a movement of the Jackson Hole economy away from traditional ranching to tourism, which is documented by the Flat Creek Ranch.

Carrington had worked at the Bar B C Dude Ranch from 1912 on, and established Flat Creek as a dude ranch. Cissy Patterson appeared in Jackson Hole 1916 as "Countess Gizycka", on the rebound from a failed marriage to a Polish count. Carrington and Patterson toured Europe together in 1922. Through Patterson's influence with US Senator Francis E. Warren, Carrington obtained a homestead patent on the ranch and then sold it to Patterson for $5000. In 1923 she built seven cabins, a barn and a lodge on the property.

Currently, the property is owned by journalists Joseph Albright and Marcia Kunstel. Albright, the former husband of the late Madeleine Albright, is the son of Cissy Patterson's niece Josephine Patterson Albright (daughter of Joseph Medill Patterson), who inherited the property at Patterson's death in 1948.
