= James Joseph Patterson =

- Born: 1923
- Died: June 24, 1992 (aged 68–69)
- Occupations: News reporter and editor
- Spouses: Dorothy Marie Clarke (m. 1944; div. 1968) Barbara McMartin (m. 1968; div. 1976)
- Father: Joseph Medill Patterson

James Joseph Patterson (March 23, 1923 – June 24, 1992) was an American newspaper executive who was part of an influential publishing family.

== Biography ==
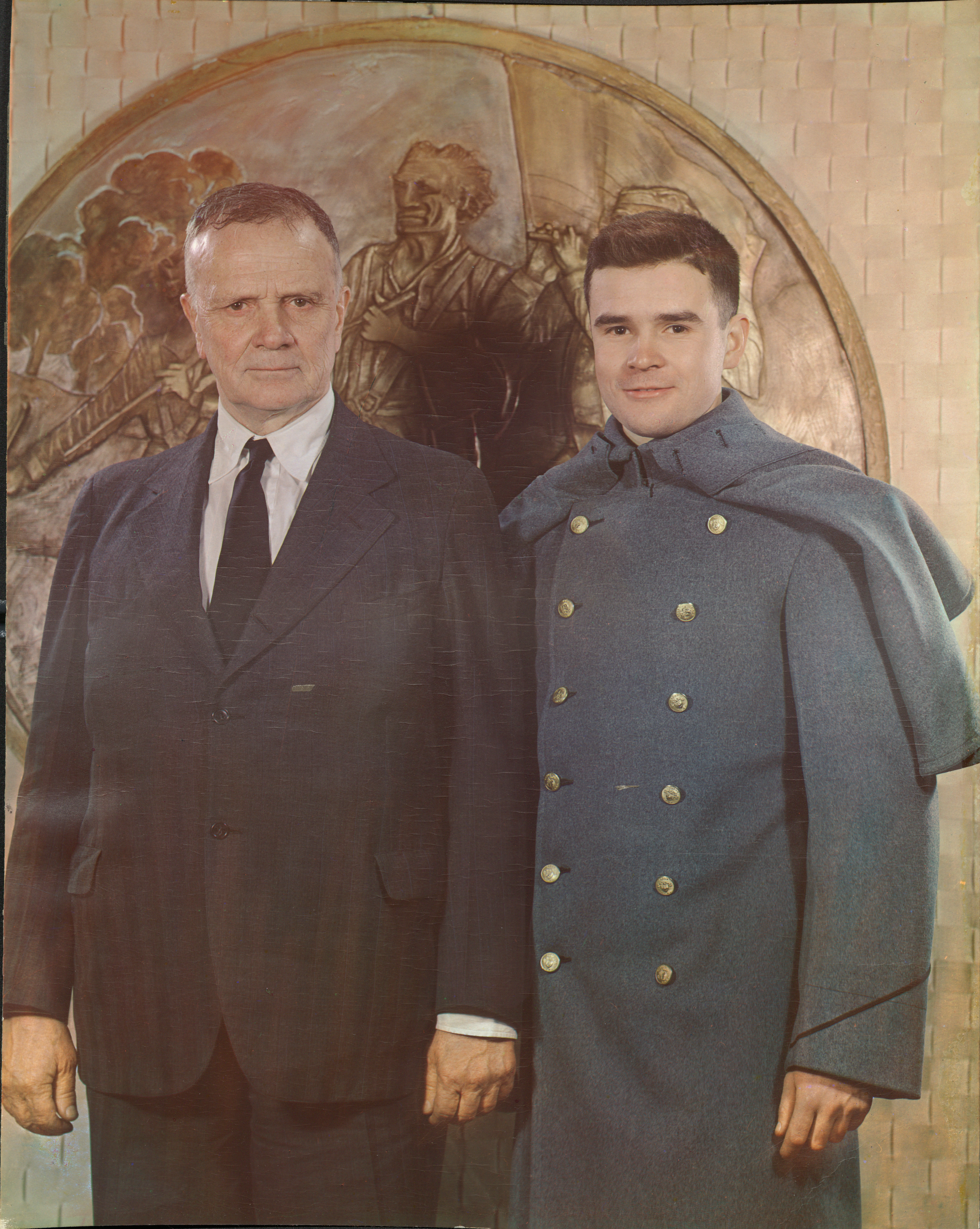
James Joseph Patterson with father Joseph Medill Patterson, circa 1944

James Joseph Patterson was born in England on March 23, 1923, and raised in Ossining, New York. He was the only son of Joseph Medill Patterson, the founder of the New York Daily News, and Mary King. King was the first female editor of the Chicago Tribune. James was a great-grandson of Joseph Medill, owner of the Chicago Tribune and mayor of Chicago.

Patterson was educated at the Scarborough School and Millard's Preparatory School before attending West Point, where he graduated with the Class of 1944. As a child he worked as a copy boy for the Daily News. During World War II he served as a cadet assigned to infantry armored forces under General George Patton in Europe and then with occupation forces in Japan, eventually achieving the rank of captain in the United States Army. He was recalled to military service in 1951 during the Korean War and was assigned to Germany.

In April 1944, his engagement was announced to Dorothy Marie Clarke (born May 4, 1922). James and Dorothy had first met in a grade school run by St. Augustine Catholic Church in Ossining. Dorothy's father was a prison guard at Sing Sing who was raised one of fifteen siblings. The couple were married on June 10, 1944, in the Catholic Church. For a period they lived in Hopkinsville, Kentucky, where James served as lieutenant in the Anti Tank Co., 10th Infantry Regiment at Camp Campbell. They divorced in 1968 without children.

In 1949, Patterson joined the Daily News as a reporter in the Washington, D.C., bureau. He also worked as a copy editor, a police reporter, telegraph desk man, and makeup editor. In 1955 he was appointed to the Daily News' board of directors. In 1958 he became vice president and assistant managing editor of the Daily News. In 1964 he and his mother Mary King were elected as vice presidents for the News Syndicate Company, Inc. (the publisher of the Daily News). In 1968 he was made a director of the Tribune Company. He was also made director of the Chicago Tribune-New York News Syndicate Co., Inc., and the New York television station WPIX.

In January 1968, Patterson married Barbara McMartin, a mathematician who completed her PhD in 1972. She also was an environmental activist and writer about the Adirondack Mountains and Park. The couple divorced in 1976 without children. Patterson died on June 24, 1992, in Washington, D.C.

== Legacy ==
Patterson's first wife Dorothy Clarke Patterson died September 30, 2007. In 2008, her estate made one of the ten largest charitable bequests of the year in the United States. The bequest to create the Patterson Foundation in Sarasota, Florida was estimated to be $225 million. Unlike many large donors, Dorothy left few guidelines for the gift.

Patterson's nephew, Joseph Albright, son of his older half-sister Josephine Patterson Albright (1913–1996), married Madeleine Korbel, who had immigrated as a child with her family from Czechoslovakia after World War II. Her father was a diplomat in Europe, and she spoke several languages. She completed her higher education in the United States, graduating from Wellesley, and earning an MA and PhD at Columbia University. She later served as Secretary of State under President Bill Clinton.

Patterson's older half-sister, Alicia Patterson (1906–1963), founded Newsday, a regional newspaper on Long Island.

== Family tree ==
Medill Chicago family tree

Joseph Medill (1823–1899)	Katherine Patrick
Robert Wilson Patterson (1850–1910)	Elinor Medill (1855–1933)	Katherine van Etta Medill (1853–1932)	Robert Sanderson McCormick (1849–1919)
Joseph Medill Patterson (1879–1946)	Eleanor Josephine Medill Patterson (1884–1948)	Ruth Hanna (1880–1944)	Joseph Medill McCormick (1877–1925)	Robert Rutherford McCormick (1880–1955)
Alicia Patterson (1906–1963)	Harry Frank Guggenheim (1890–1971)	Jay Frederick Reeve (1893–1956)	Josephine Medill Patterson (1913–1996)	Ivan Le Lorraine Albright (1897–1983)	James Joseph Patterson (1923–1992)
Madeleine Jana Korbel (1937–2022)	Joseph Medill Patterson Reeve, later Albright (born 1937)	Alice Reeve, later Albright (1940–2016)	Michael J. Arlen (born 1930)
