= Barbara McMartin =

American mathematician

- Born: November 18, 1931; Boston, Massachusetts
- Died: September 27, 2005 (aged 73); Canada Lake, New York
- Education: PhD in Mathematics from City University of New York, June 1972 MA in Mathematics from Hunter College, June 1964 AB from Vassar College, June 1962
- Occupation: Adirondack Author
- Spouse: James Joseph Patterson (m. 1968; div. 1976) Walter Alexander Reid (m. 1982)

Barbara McMartin (November 18, 1931 – September 27, 2005) was an American mathematician who became an environmentalist and author of 25 books on the Adirondack Mountains.

== Life ==
Barbara McMartin was born November 18, 1931, in Boston, Massachusetts. Her father was physician D. Malcolm McMartin, and mother was Barbara (Clark) McMartin. She grew up with her family in Johnstown, New York, where her father had his practice. She was valedictorian of the Class of 1949 of Johnstown High School. McMartin married young and had three children. She returned to college later, graduating from Vassar College, cum laude in Mathematics in 1964. She earned a master's degree from Hunter College, and in 1972 she received a PhD in mathematics from the Graduate Division of City University of New York. Her dissertation was One Relator Metabelian Groups under advisors Gilbert Baumslag, Wilhelm Magnus, and Joan Landman Dyer.

In 1972, McMartin turned from mathematics and became involved in the environmental movement in the Adirondacks of New York State, where her primary focus was the nature, culture, and management in the Park. She served as vice-president the Adirondack Mountain Club and the Association for the Protection of the Adirondacks and was a member of many environmental groups.

Between 1972 and 2005, she wrote 25 books, both guide books and histories of the Adirondacks. She wrote and maintained the popular eleven book Discover series, which covers all regions of the Adirondack Park for outdoors people. Her other guides include: The Adirondack Park, A Wildlands Quilt; Fifty Hikes in the Adirondacks; Fifty Hikes in the Hudson Valley; and three books for young people, on hiking, camping, and canoeing.

In 1976, McMartin completed Caroga, an Adirondack Town Recalls its Past. Her other histories include: Hides, Hemlocks and Adirondack History, The Great Forest of the Adirondacks, To the Lake of the Skies (story of the Benedicts), The Glove Cities, Perspectives on the Adirondacks, The Privately Owned Adirondacks and Adirondack Timeline. She also wrote a series of pamphlets and Citizen's Guides for the Adirondack Park Agency.

McMartin served on New York State Department of Environmental Conservation advisory committees: the High Peaks Advisory Committee from 1974 to 1978, and the Forest Preserve Advisory Committee from 1979 to 2003. She chaired the Forest Preserve Advisory Committee from 1979 to 2003 where she helped write many policies.

She served as volunteer curator at the Caroga Historical Museum and at the Fulton County Museum. She had photograph exhibits of her work and published many magazine articles. In 1992 she chaired the NYS Adirondack Park Centennial.

She received a Founder's Day Award from the Adirondack Museum in Blue Mountain Lake, as well as both the Adirondack Communicator and Adirondack Heritage Awards from the Adirondack Council.

=== Marriages ===
McMartin's first husband was Edward B Long III. They had three children, James Long, Nancy Long, and Margaret (Long) Lawrence. Her four grandchildren are Alicia Loomis, Catherine Loomis, Elizabeth Lawrence, and Daniel Lawrence.

In 1968, McMartin married her second husband, James Joseph Patterson, publisher of The New York Daily News. They divorced in 1976. He predeceased her in 1992.

She married again, to Walter Alexander Reid in 1982. He brought two daughters to the marriage.

McMartin died on September 27, 2005, in Canada Lake, New York and was survived by her husband, children, and grandchildren.

== Selected books ==
- McMartin, Barbara (1994). The Great Forest of the Adirondacks. Utica, New York: North Country Books. ISBN 0-925168-29-7.
- McMartin, Barbara (2004). Privately Owned Adirondacks: Sporting and Family Clubs, Private Parks and Preserves, Timberlands and Easements. Caroga, New York: Lake View Press. ISBN 1-888374-20-9.
- McMartin, Barbara (2002). Perspectives on the Adirondacks: A Thirty-year Struggle by People Protecting Their Treasure. Syracuse, New York: Syracuse University Press. ISBN 0-8156-0895-0.
- McMartin, Barbara (2000). The Adirondack Park: A Wildlands Quilt. Syracuse, New York: Syracuse University Press. ISBN 0-8156-0567-6.
- McMartin, Barbara (1992). Hemlocks, and Adirondack History: How the Tanning Industry Influenced the Region's Growth. Utica, New York: North Country Books. ISBN 0-932052-99-1.
