= Alicia Patterson =

American journalist (1906–1963)

- Born: October 15, 1906
- Died: July 2, 1963 (aged 56)
- Occupation: Journalist
- Spouses: James Simpson, Jr. (m. 1927; div. 1930) Joseph W. Brooks (m. 1931; div. 1939) Harry Frank Guggenheim (m. 1939)
- Father: Joseph Medill Patterson

Alicia Patterson (October 15, 1906 – July 2, 1963) was an American journalist, and cofounder and editor of New York daily newspaper Newsday. She created the Deathless Deer comic strip with Neysa McMein in 1943.

== Early life ==
Patterson was the second daughter of Alice (née Higinbotham) and Joseph Medill Patterson, the founder of the New York Daily News, and a great-granddaughter of Joseph Medill, owner of the Chicago Tribune. (Note: Her paternal aunt, Eleanor Medill Patterson was the publisher of the Washington Times-Herald.) Her mother's father was Harlow Niles Higinbotham, partner of Marshall Field's Department Store in Chicago. Patterson's sisters were Elinor (1904–1984) and Josephine Medill Patterson Albright (1913–1996). Patterson's half-brother, James Joseph Patterson (1922–1992), was the son of Joseph Patterson and Mary King (1885–1975), who married in 1938, the same year Joseph and Alice's divorce was finalized.

The Patterson family lived on a farm in Libertyville, Illinois in her earliest years, during a period when her father eschewed capitalism. He returned to the publishing world in 1910, as editor of the Chicago Tribune. He sent Patterson to Germany to live with a family and learn German when she was four years old. During her childhood, Patterson's father taught her daring sports, like high diving and jumping while horseback riding, to test her courage.

Patterson attended the Francis Parker School and University School for Girls in Chicago. She was then sent to finishing schools in Maryland and Lausanne, Switzerland, from which she was expelled for violating the rules. She attended the Foxcroft School in Virginia, where she finished second in her class earning a Veterinarian degree, and was then sent to a school in Rome where she was expelled for behavior issues. At age 19 years, she had her coming-out party in Chicago, after having spent a year in Europe with her mother and sister.

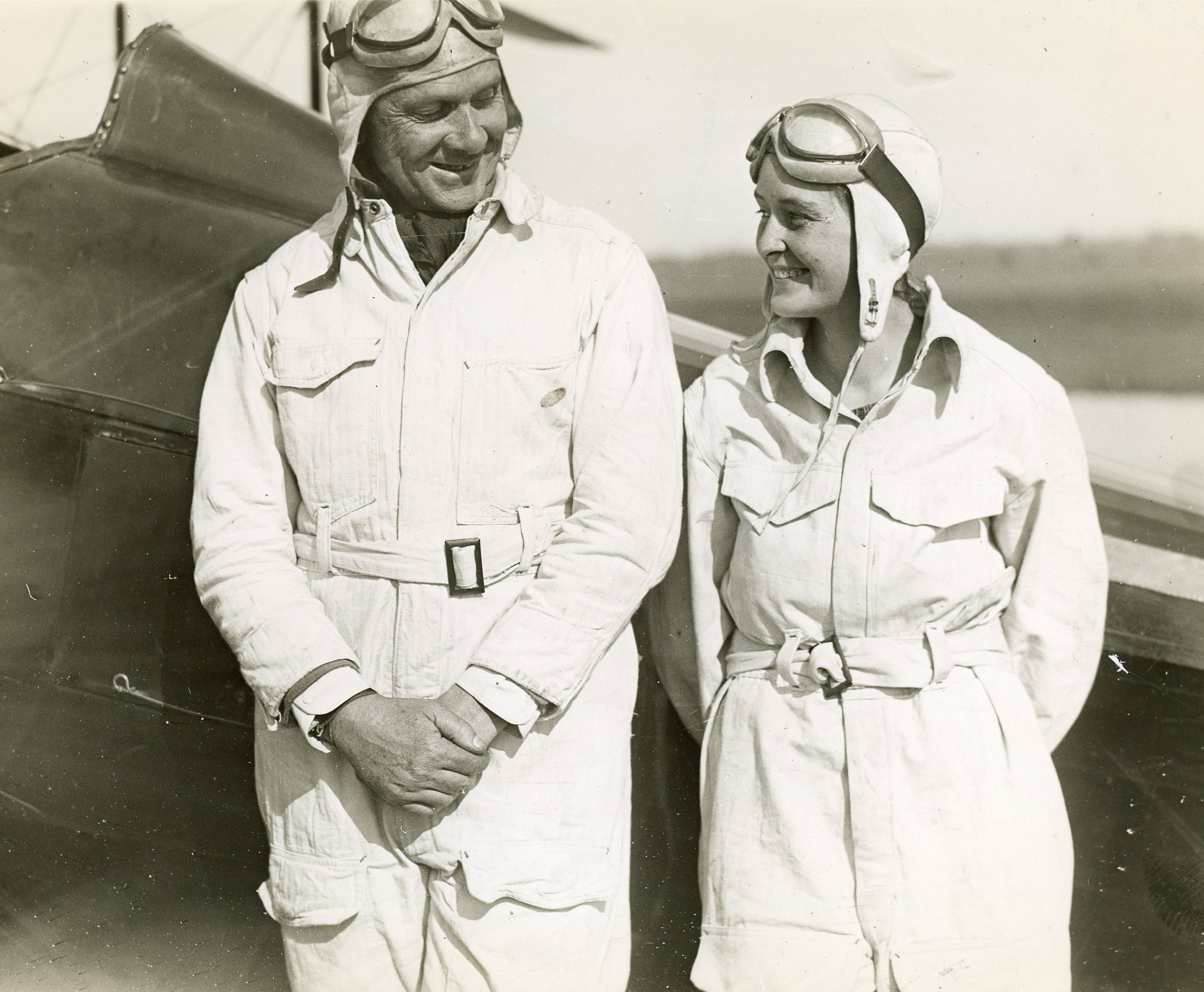
Alicia Patterson and her father in flight suits, 1929 July

At age 23, Alicia passed a private pilot license test, and at 24 she earned a commercial pilot's license after logging 75 solo hours at Roosevelt field and receiving instruction from Frederick Becker. The same year, she achieved a new speed record for women flying between Philadelphia and New York (40 minutes, 15 seconds) in a Laird Speedwing. She and her father would make international flights together in his airplane Liberty. She also was an outdoor sportswoman, hunting wild boar in India, salmon-fishing in Norway, and hunting with hounds in England. In 1931, she was reported to be the first white woman to have successfully hunted a Gaur in Indochina.

== Marriages ==
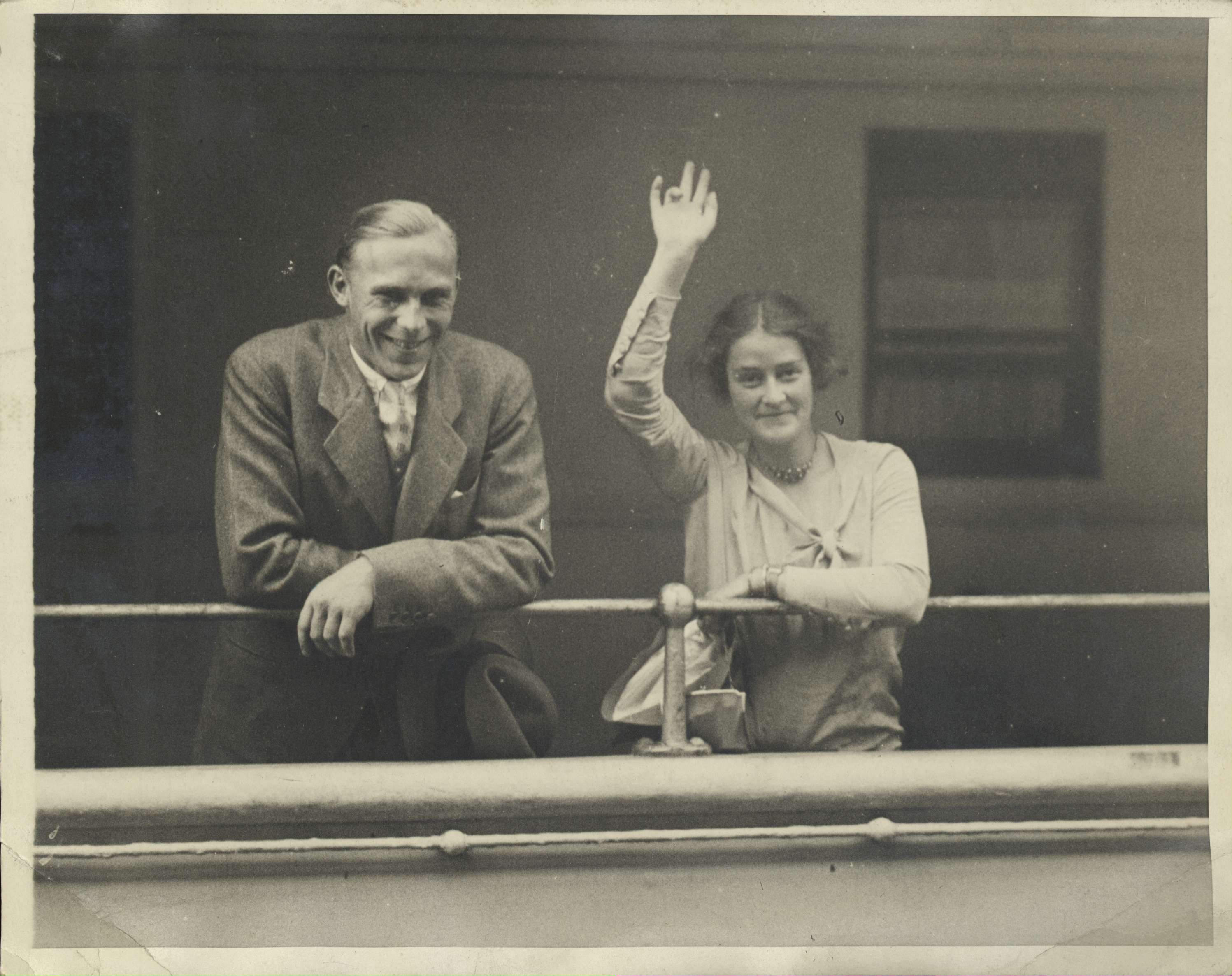
Alicia Patterson and James Simpson Jr., RMS Laconia, 1927

Patterson married James Simpson, Jr., the son of Marshall Field's chairman of the board, in September 1927, according to her father's bidding. The couple lived together only one year and were divorced in October 1930; Patterson charged Simpson with desertion one year after their marriage.

In 1931, she married Joseph W. Brooks, a Williams College alum, captain of a 42nd Division machine gun company during World War I, and son of Belvidere Brooks, a former vice president of Western Union. Brooks also held a transport pilot's license. They divorced in 1939.

In 1939, she married her third husband, Harry Guggenheim, who had been a United States ambassador to Cuba. Guggenheim was on active duty for the military during World War II, during which time Patterson ran Newsday. When Guggenheim returned, he ran the administrative aspects of the business. While she was married to Guggenheim, Patterson had a long-running affair with Adlai Stevenson, governor of Illinois and two-time Democratic nominee for president. Alicia had no children but was very close to her younger sister Josephine's children Joseph and Alice Albright. She used her birth surname for her editing and publishing career.

== Career ==
Patterson's early news jobs included advertising the New York Daily News by placing placards in grocery and drug stores, and selling Liberty Magazine house to house. She worked in the promotion department the Daily News in 1927, before being assigned as a reporter. She socialized with other young reporters at speakeasies and misspelled the names of the parties involved in a high-profile divorce case, for which the newspaper was sued for libel. She returned to Chicago after she was fired, then married Harry Frank Guggenheim, who was Jewish.

Patterson also had a career in comics, creating the character Deathless Deer with Neysa McMein. It ran in the Boston Herald and the Chicago Tribune in 1943.

Harry Guggenheim used a portion of the Guggenheim family's fortune to help his wife purchase a newspaper in Hempstead and found Newsday in Hempstead in 1940. Guggenheim awarded 49% of the paper's stock to his wife, and retained 51% for himself. Newsday's use of investigative journalism, "lively style", and coverage of liberal and international politics led it to become a respected newspaper. In 1954, it won the Pulitzer Prize for exposing corruption at New York's trotting tracks, and became the country's largest suburban newspaper. Patterson used the paper as a vehicle to create an identity for Long Island.

According to historian Marilyn Elizabeth Perry:

Despite her own political opinions Patterson balanced the news coverage at Newsday, giving equal treatment to both Republican and Democratic candidates. Under her able leadership Newsday grew to become the largest suburban and twelfth-largest evening newspaper in the country, with a circulation nearing 400,000 in the 1960s. Until her death from bleeding ulcers she remained an active publisher and editor. She had intended for her niece and nephew to inherit the paper one day, but after her death her husband took over operations. Patterson was headstrong and said to have an explosive temper, but her good sense, determination, and invaluable editing brought city publishing to the suburbs. Patterson never wanted to make money or gain political power from Newsday. She maintained that all she wanted was “a good newspaper.”

By 1959, Newsday had achieved a circulation of 300,000. In 1963, Patterson was awarded an honorary Doctor of Letters degree from Lake Forest College (the College's first president had been Alicia's great-grandfather, Robert W. Patterson).

== Death ==
Patterson died aged 56, of complications following stomach surgery for an ulcer, on July 2, 1963. Her ashes are interred at her hunting lodge in Kingsland, Georgia.

John Steinbeck, Patterson's friend since 1956, wrote a series of articles in the form of "Letters to Alicia" for Newsday following her death. In them he expressed his controversial views, such as his support for President Lyndon B. Johnson's handling of the Vietnam War and his perception of moral decline within the United States. The series was written at the request of Harry Guggenheim, who became the editor of the newspaper following Patterson's death, with Patterson's nephew, Joseph Albright, working as his assistant editor. (Note: Joseph Albright was married to former United States Secretary of State Madeleine Albright.)

== Legacy ==
Patterson was memorialized by Joan Miró's mural, Alicia, at the Guggenheim Museum, proposed by Harry F. Guggenheim, who was then president of the Solomon R. Guggenheim Foundation.

The Alicia Patterson Foundation, created in accordance with her will, presents an annual prize to mid-career journalists.

In 2016, Alice and Michael J. Arlen authored book The Huntress: The Adventures, Escapades and Triumphs of Alicia Patterson: Aviatrix, Sportswoman, Journalist, Publisher.
