= Mary King (news editor) =

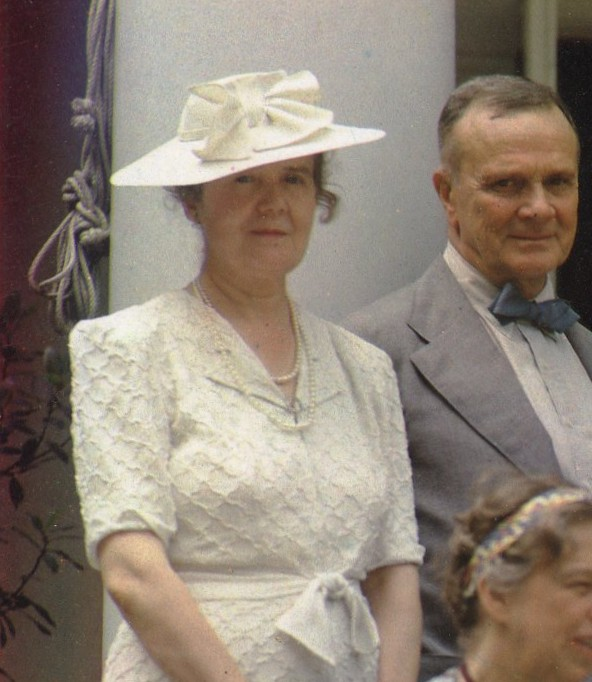
Mary King Patterson with husband Joseph Medill Patterson, 1940

Mary King (December 3, 1885 – December 27, 1975) was a news editor, a director of the Tribune Company, and the second wife of Joseph Medill Patterson.

== Biography ==
King was born in Chicago, Illinois on December 3, 1885, to Mary McMahon and Dr. William King, and was raised with six siblings: William Jr., John, Kyran, Francis, Lulu, and Loretta. She was educated at Sacred Heart School, St. Mary's High School, and took business classes in Chicago. In 1907, at age 22, she began work at the Chicago Tribune as assistant secretary to Joseph Medill McCormick, selecting content for the "Bright Sayings of the Children" feature and reviewing manuscripts for the Sunday editor. She rose to the position of assistant Sunday editor and then Sunday editor of the Tribune. While at the Tribune, King influenced the paper to include more content for women, including how to cope with assaults, how to cook and sew, how to help the needy, and how to dress and present oneself. Mary King and publisher Joseph Medill Patterson had a son, James Joseph Patterson, in 1923. In 1924 she moved to New York City and became women's editor of Liberty Magazine, founded by cousins Robert R. McCormick and Joseph Medill Patterson.

When Liberty was sold in 1931, she became women's editor and fiction editor of the New York Daily News (founded in 1919 by Patterson as the Illustrated Daily News). As fiction editor, King bought many light novels from popular authors, including Booth Tarkington, George Barr McCutcheon, and Agatha Christie. She and Ruth Hanna McCormick, cousin of Joseph Medill Patterson, corresponded about the value of newspaper work for women. Her sister Loretta also worked for the News as a movie critic, writing under the pen name "Kate Cameron." At the News, Mary King founded the tradition of the Harvest Moon Ball, a dancing contest sponsored by the News and held in Madison Square Garden, in 1935. Its first year it was held as a free show in Central Park, and more than 100,000 attended. The Harvest Moon Ball was intended to appeal to women in the same way the Golden Gloves boxing title was imagined by News Sports Editor Paul Gallico to appeal to men.

King married Joseph Medill Patterson on July 5, 1938. Patterson was divorced from his first wife Alice Higinbotham on June 10, 1938, when she charged him with desertion since 1928. After Patterson's death in 1946, and before King's passing in 1975 at age 90, King worked as a director of the Chicago Tribune Corp., News Syndicate Co., Inc., the Chicago Tribune-New York News Syndicate, Inc., WPIX, Inc., and the News Welfare Association, Inc. She has contributed to biographies of Patterson's sister, journalist and editor Cissy Patterson. She continued editorial work into her 80s, officially retiring in 1969, having served as a director of the Tribune Company since 1948. She has had multiple books dedicated to her by women author friends (Lillian Barker, Mignon Good Eberhart, and Faith Baldwin).
