= Joseph Medill Patterson =

American journalist (1879–1946)

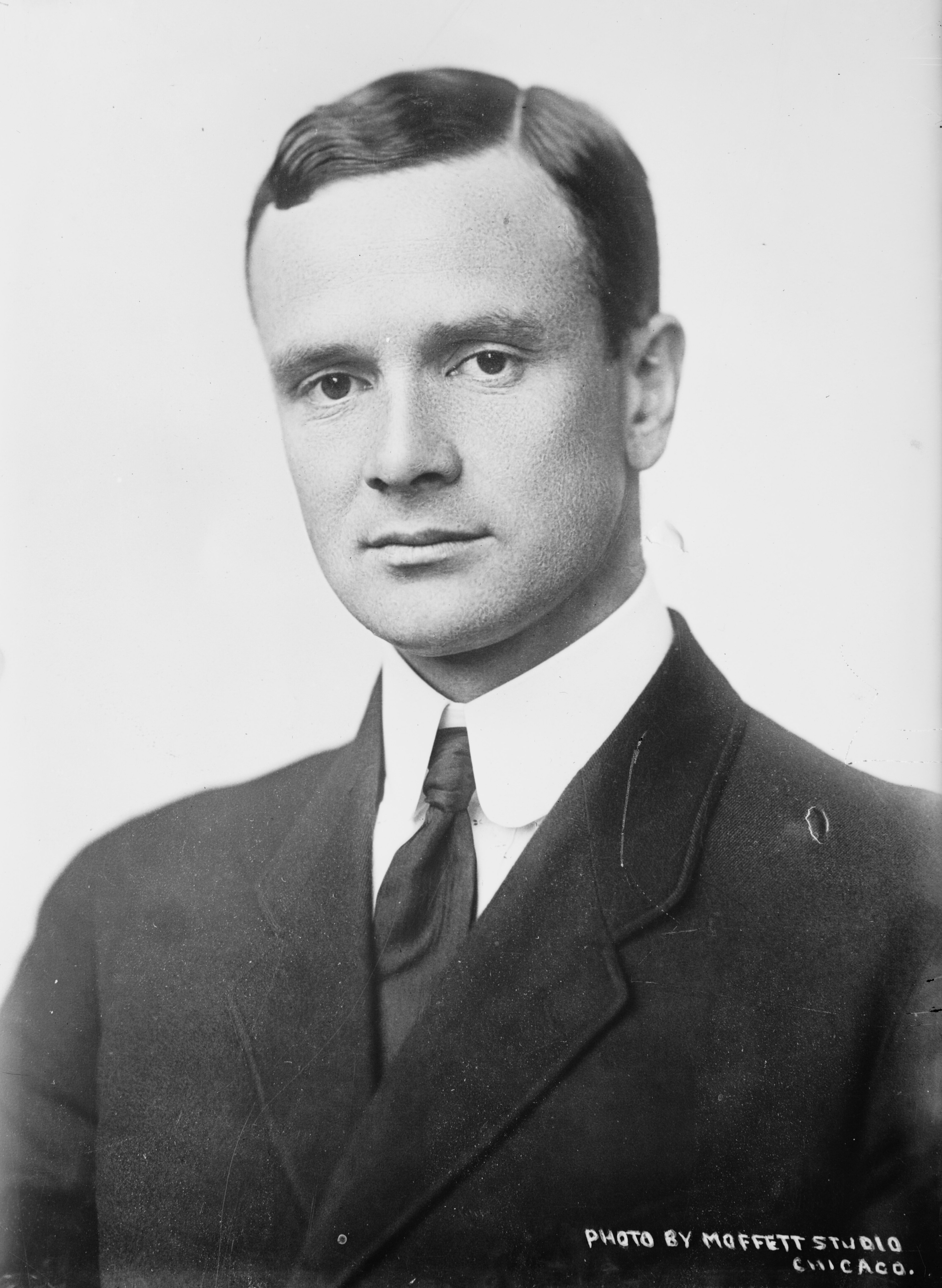
- c. 1910s–1920s
- Born: January 6, 1879
- Died: May 26, 1946 (aged 67)
- Occupation: Journalist
- Known for: Chicago Tribune; New York Daily News
- Spouse(s): Alice Higinbotham; Mary King
- Children: Elinor Medill Patterson; Alicia Patterson; Josephine Medill Patterson; James Joseph Patterson
- Parent(s): Robert Wilson Patterson Jr. Elinor Medill
- Relatives: Cissy Patterson (sister); Joseph Medill (grandfather)

Member of the Illinois House of Representatives from the 31st district
- In office January 7, 1903 – January 4, 1905

Personal details
- Party: Republican
- Other political affiliations: Socialist (1906–c. 1911)

Joseph Medill Patterson (January 6, 1879 – May 26, 1946) was an American journalist and publisher who founded the New York Daily News. At the time of his death, it maintained a Sunday circulation of 4.5 million copies, the largest circulation of any paper in the United States.

== Early life and education ==
Joseph Medill Patterson was born into a newspaper family. His mother, Elinor Medill, was a daughter of Joseph Medill, founder of the Chicago Tribune and a mayor of Chicago, Illinois. His father, Robert Wilson Patterson Jr., was himself a journalist at the Tribune.

As a scion of a millionaire family, Joseph received a top-flight education, attending Yale University where he was a member of Scroll and Key. He briefly left school to report on the Boxer Rebellion in China as a foreign correspondent for the Tribune, returning in time to complete his studies and graduate from Yale in 1901.

== Career ==
Patterson became one of the most significant newspaper publishers in the United States, founding the New York Daily News and introducing the tabloid format. He was groomed to follow in the footsteps of his namesake grandfather. As a young adult, he asked his father if he could go to China to cover the Boxer Rebellion. Granted permission, he went as a correspondent for William Randolph Hearst but did not arrive in time.

Upon graduation, he returned to Chicago, and covered the police beat for the Chicago Tribune. In 1903 he was part of a campaign committee led by his cousin Joseph Medill McCormick in support of Republican Nominee for 21st Ward Alderman candidate Fletcher Dobyns. Patterson served in the Illinois House of Representatives as a Republican from 1903 to 1905. From 1905 to 1906 he served as the City of Chicago's Commissioner of Public Works.

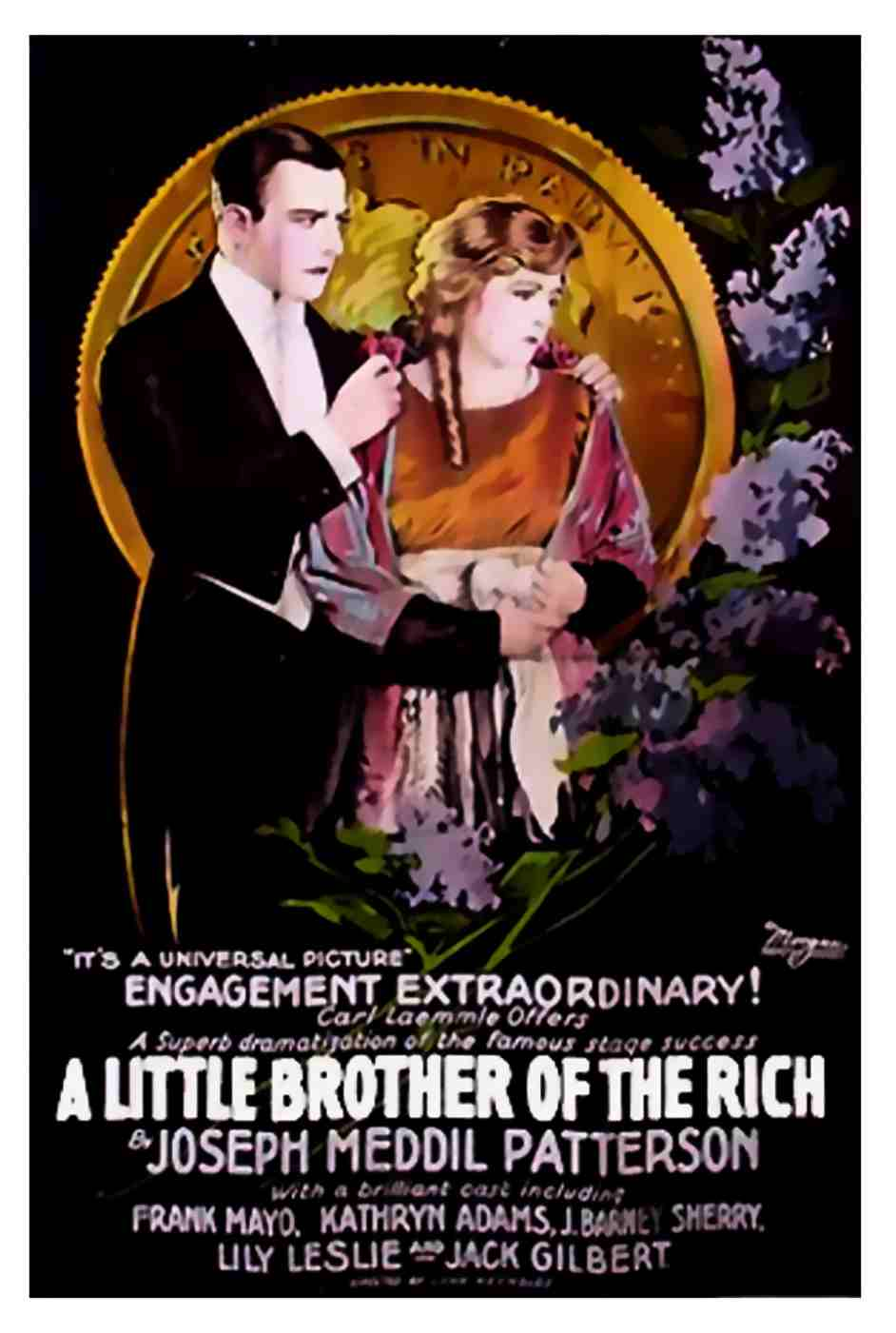
Poster for A Little Brother of the Rich (1919), adapted from Patterson's novel and play

Joseph Medill Patterson feuded with his father and resigned from the Tribune. Patterson moved to a farm in the country, wrote a socialist novel, A Little Brother of the Rich (1908), shortly thereafter adapted for the stage, and published a muckraking article in Woman's World magazine, "The Sins of Society." In 1909 Patterson co-authored the play "The Fourth Estate" with Harriet Ford and James Keeley (that continued to be performed through at least 1930) and wrote playlet "Dope" about cocaine trafficking, and in 1910 authored plays "The Book of Judith," a modern retelling of the story of Judith and Holofernes, and "Rebellion," a drama about divorce that was denounced by Evanston's Catholic pastor, Rev. H.P. Smyth: "There is nothing in that printer's ink can do to save that play from being damned." The starring neglected wife role of "Rebellion" was performed by Gertrude Elliott. In 1911 he co-authored play "No Extradition" with Hugh Ford, based on the writings of O. Henry, and in 1912 he authored play "By-Products," starring his sister Cissy Patterson, to critical success. In 1914 his play "The Sell-Out" debuted with the Chicago Grand Opera Company. Patterson returned to work at the Tribune by 1910.

After his father died in 1910, Patterson took over the management of the Tribune. He had a dispute about how to run the Tribune with his cousin, Robert R. McCormick. After World War I ended and he returned from military service, he visited London and observed a newspaper in tabloid form for the first time. Patterson moved to New York City and founded the New York Daily News (first called the New York Illustrated News) as a tabloid that debuted June 26, 1919, with McCormick as co-editor and publisher. William H. Field (the Tribune's second vice president) had begun preparation for the tabloid's debut beginning in September 1918. In 1924, McCormick and Patterson co-founded Liberty magazine, which they sold to Bernarr MacFadden in April 1931. In 1925 Patterson ceded full authority over the Tribune to McCormick in return for full control of the Daily News.

During the 1930s, the Daily News under Patterson's leadership strongly supported Franklin D. Roosevelt and his New Deal. Both men counted each other as not only political allies but good friends, having met as classmates at the Groton School. In May 1940, Roosevelt even asked Patterson to be his Secretary of the Navy but was turned down. Although Patterson, along with his sister Cissy Patterson, supported the president's reelection in 1940, Joe and Cissy had a falling out with Roosevelt because of their opposition to Lend-Lease and other aspects of the administration's foreign policy. After Japan's attack on Pearl Harbor, Patterson immediately came to the oval office and offered his full support to the war effort but Roosevelt rebuffed him. "Roosevelt could easily have converted both Pattersons to his cause," writes Cissy's biographer, Ralph G. Martin. "Instead, he created two bitter and powerful enemies." In addition, as he had since early in 1941, Roosevelt repeatedly pressured Attorney General Francis Biddle and other officials to investigate and prosecute both of the Pattersons along with their cousin Robert R. McCormick of the Chicago Daily Tribune. At the time of his death, Patterson was president of the News Syndicate, Co, Inc., a subsidiary corporation of the Tribune that published the Daily News and was involved in building, shipping, paper, and radio.

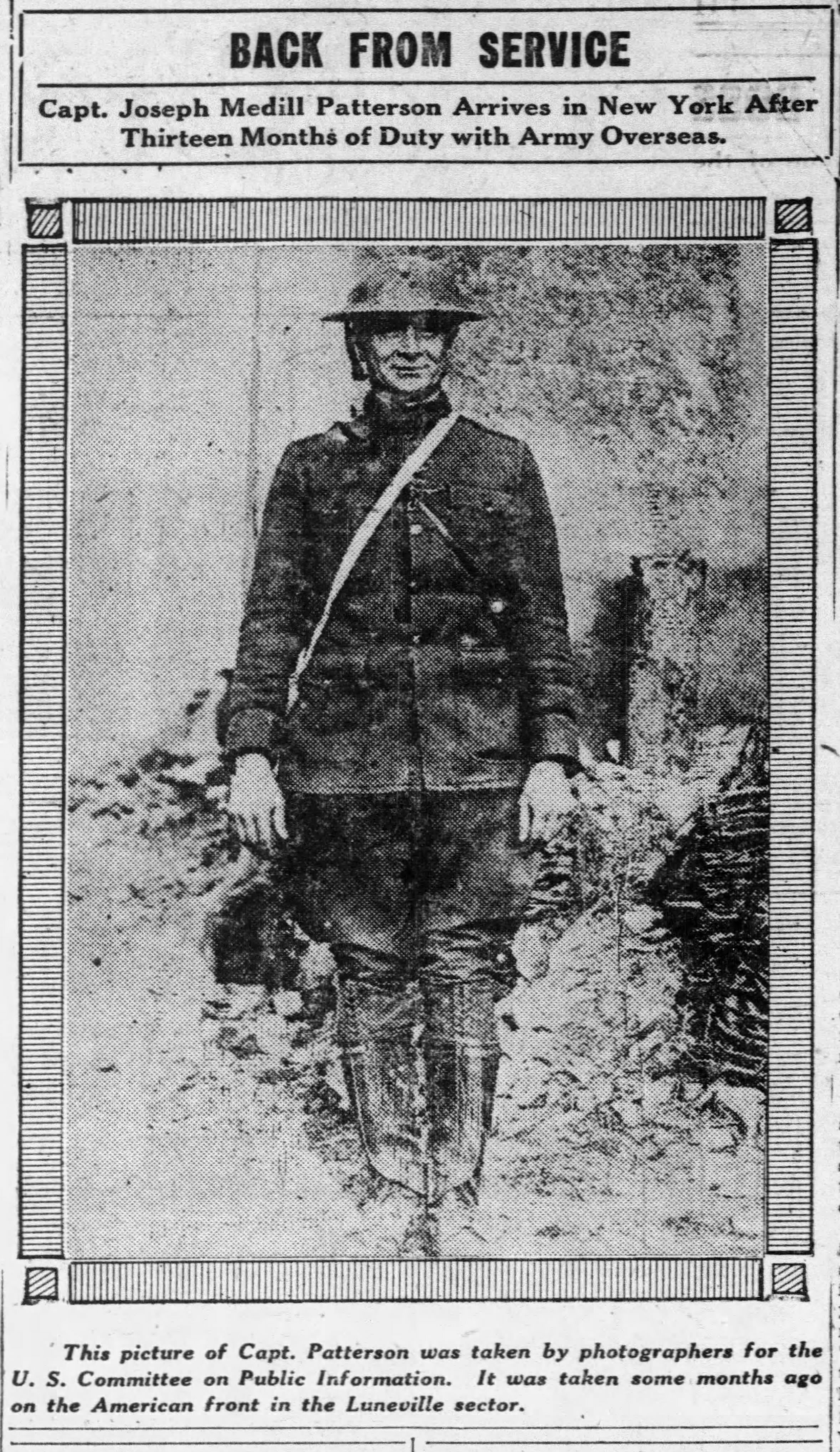
Captain Joseph Medill Patterson on the American front in France, 1918

== Military Service ==
Early in 1914, he was covering the Battle of Veracruz in Mexico. Following the start of World War I in July 1914, in August he traveled to Europe with Tribune cameraman Edwin F. Weigle to follow the German army, filming the newsreel that would be used in the World War I propaganda film The German Side of the War. Screenings of The German Side of the War sold out at theaters. It was one of the only American propaganda films to show the war from Germany's perspective. He served as a war correspondent for the Tribune in France and Belgium as well as Germany. When the national guard was mobilized in June 1916, Patterson served with Battery C, First Battalion of Artillery, stepping away from editorial management of the Tribune; during this period William H. Field and Edward S. Beck (second vice president and managing editor) took over; in 1918 Samuel Emory Thomason was appointed Business Manager. In August 1916 Patterson was offered a promotion from First to Second Lieutenant, but declined it stating others were better qualified. In September he served in the high-risk volunteer position of observing and directing artillery fire from an air balloon. By Spring 1918 he was serving with the 149th Field Artillery regiment of the American Expeditionary Forces, and by August he had been advanced to the rank of Captain. In October he was offered leave to return to the United States and become Major of another unit, but he declined to stay with his regiment. Following the war's end in November, in December he returned to Chicago, having served thirteen months at the front and been gassed in action. The same month he hosted "mothers, wives, and sisters" of his artillery unit at his home to receive personal messages and hear of their experiences.

== Comic strips ==
He took a hands-on approach to managing the Chicago Tribune Syndicate, distributor for his papers' comic strips. In 1921, he suggested the lead character of Gasoline Alley adopt a foundling child who became Skeezix, a central character in the strip. Patterson influenced Chester Gould's 1931 strip Dick Tracy, changing the title from Plainclothes Tracy, and he supported Gould's vision of a technical, grotesque and violent style of storytelling. Milton Caniff credited Patterson for suggesting a comic strip about the Orient, which led to the creation of Caniff's 1934 strip, Terry and the Pirates.

Caniff recounted Patterson's role in creating Terry in a Time profile, "Escape Artist" (Monday, January 13, 1947):

Patterson... stared coldly at Caniff and asked: "Ever do anything on the Orient?" Caniff hadn't. "You know," Joe Patterson mused, "adventure can still happen out there. There could be a beautiful lady pirate, the kind men fall for." In a few days Caniff was back with samples and 50 proposed titles; Patterson circled Terry and scribbled beside it and the Pirates.

Another item of Patterson comic strip lore is that he rejected Dale Messick's strip Brenda Starr in 1940 because he "had tried a woman cartoonist once... and wanted no more of them." Patterson's assistant, Mollie Slott—later the vice president of the syndicate—saw the discarded samples, and encouraged Messick to change Brenda from a "girl bandit" to a reporter. Patterson grudgingly accepted the strip, but ran it in the Chicago Tribune's Sunday comic section, rather than the daily paper. He refused to run it in the Daily News, which finally carried Brenda Starr, Reporter in 1948, two years after Patterson's death.

== Family ==
In 1902 he married Alice Higinbotham (son of Harlow Niles Higinbotham, a business partner of Marshall Field and President of the 1893 World's Columbian Exposition). Together they had three daughters; Elinor (born 1903), Alicia (born 1906) and Josephine (born 1913). Alicia once stated, "He had wanted a boy, instead of three daughters in succession, and that meant one of the Patterson girls would have to be his substitute son." Nearly 20 years later, in 1923 his mistress and future wife Mary King (news editor) gave birth to his only son and his daughters' half-brother, James Joseph Patterson, in England. Alice and Joseph did not divorce until June 10, 1938, with Alice charging him with desertion ten years prior in 1928; Alice was granted the divorce uncontested. He married Mary King on July 5, 1938.

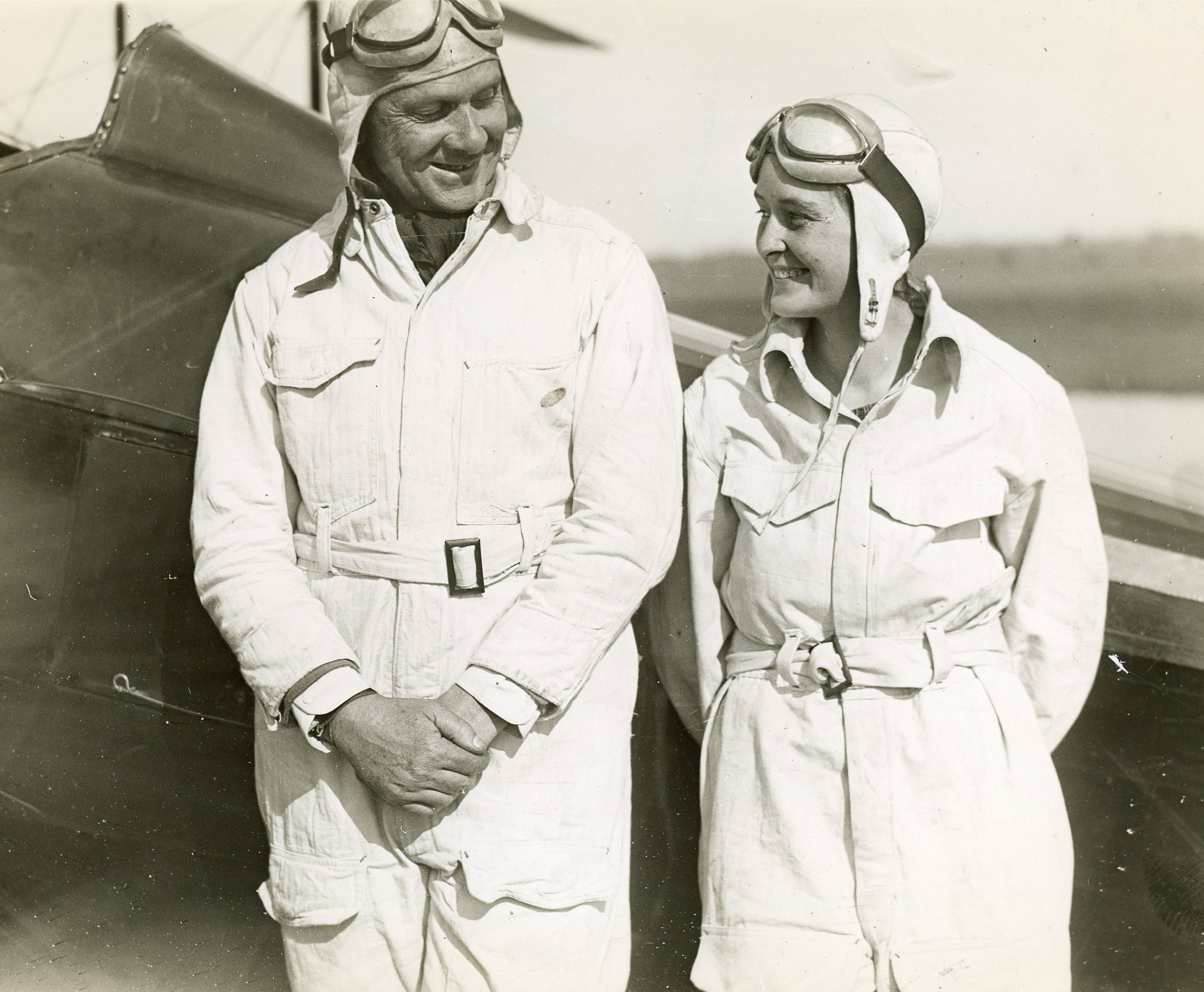
Patterson and daughter Alicia at airfield, 1929

A hobby he enjoyed with his daughters was aviation. In 1928, Patterson took flying lessons at Curtiss Field with Frederick Becker, purchased the "largest amphibian plane ever built," and named it Liberty. His daughter Alicia took flying lessons the same year. Back in 1915, he had written a piece for the Tribune, "Aircraft in the Great European War," for which he went on a flight with French pilot Robert Morane, who took him for a "loop the loop." In 1928 Patterson and Alicia took the biplane Liberty together to the West Indies, Caribbean, and Central America. He later flew around Europe (1939), Hawaii (1942), and the Philippines and Micronesia (1945).

== Legacy ==
Patterson was consistently a supporter of women's suffrage; in 1913 when British suffragette Emily Wilding Davison threw herself in front of the King's horse during the English derby in protest and died from her wounds, Patterson posted an ad in the Chicago Tribune fundraising (and pledging funds) to supply flowers for her grave "for a long time, perhaps until women obtain the vote in England."

The Medill School of Journalism which opened in 1921 at Northwestern University was funded by a Chicago Tribune foundation under the direction of Patterson (although he gave due credit to reporter Eddie Doherty for raising the idea).

Patterson was one of five members of a jury (the others being Alfred Granger, Edward S. Beck, Robert R. McCormick, and Holmes Onderdonk) that in 1922 chose from more than 260 designs the design that ultimately became the Tribune Tower.

In February 1948, Fordham University created a Journalism Chair position named for Patterson, funded by proceeds of sale of the Ossining, New York estate that Patterson had left to his widow Mary King which she had given to the university. The position was part of the Publication Division of Fordham's Department of Communication Arts. Two annual Joseph Medill Patterson journalism scholarships were also funded.

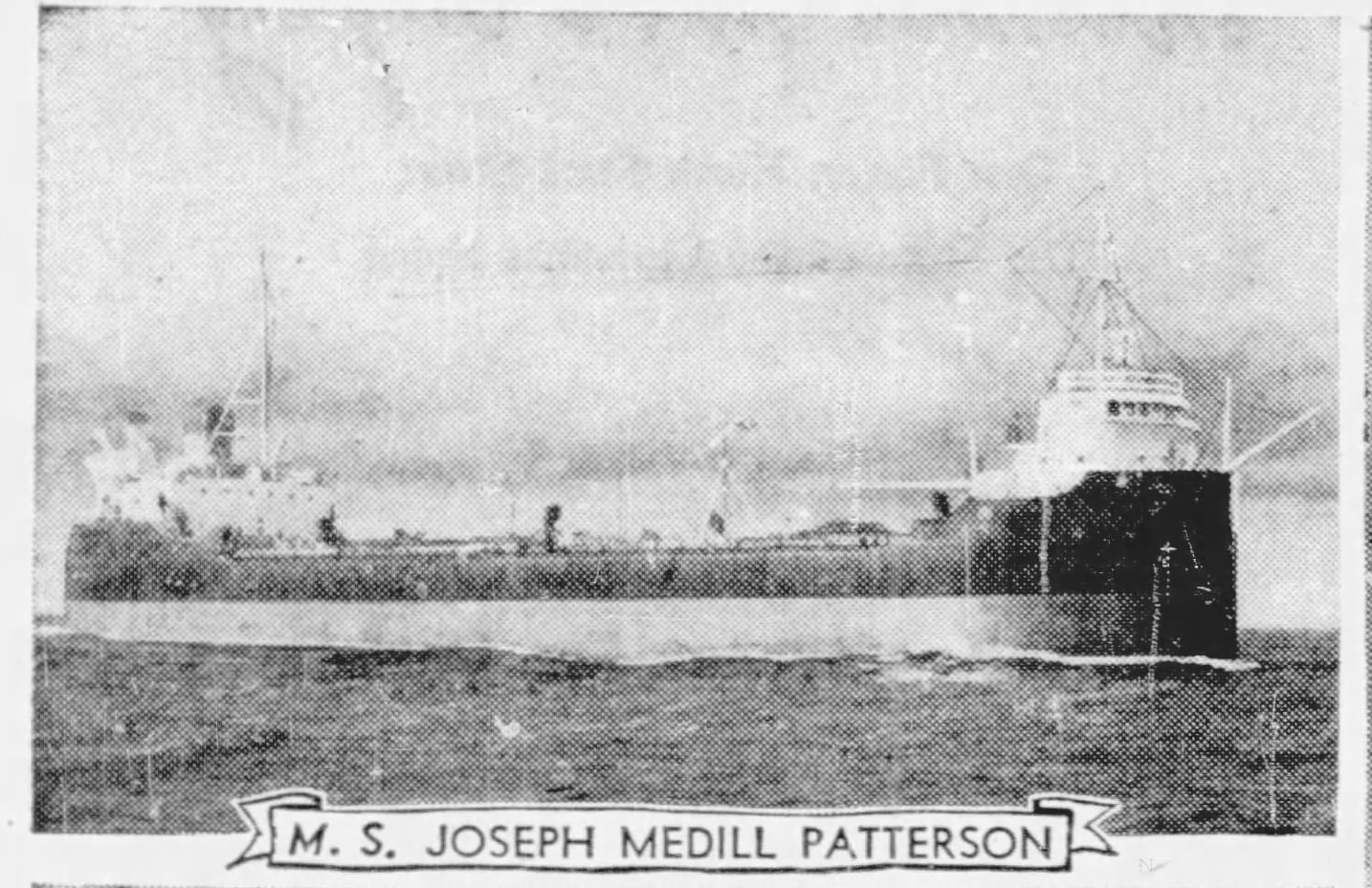
The Chicago Tribune's ship M.S. Joseph Medill Patterson

In 1952, the New York Daily News sponsored a $500 prize in Patterson's name for the yearly competition of the New York Press Photographers Association.

One of the Tribune's fleet of nine paper-carrying motor-ships was named the M.S. Joseph Medill Patterson, which operated into the 1960s.

Patterson's son, James, would serve as vice president and assistant managing editor of the Daily News. One of Patterson's grandsons, Joseph Albright, was married to future US Secretary of State Madeleine Albright for about 23 years.

Patterson died at 67 years old. His body lay in state and he was buried in Arlington National Cemetery.

== Family tree ==
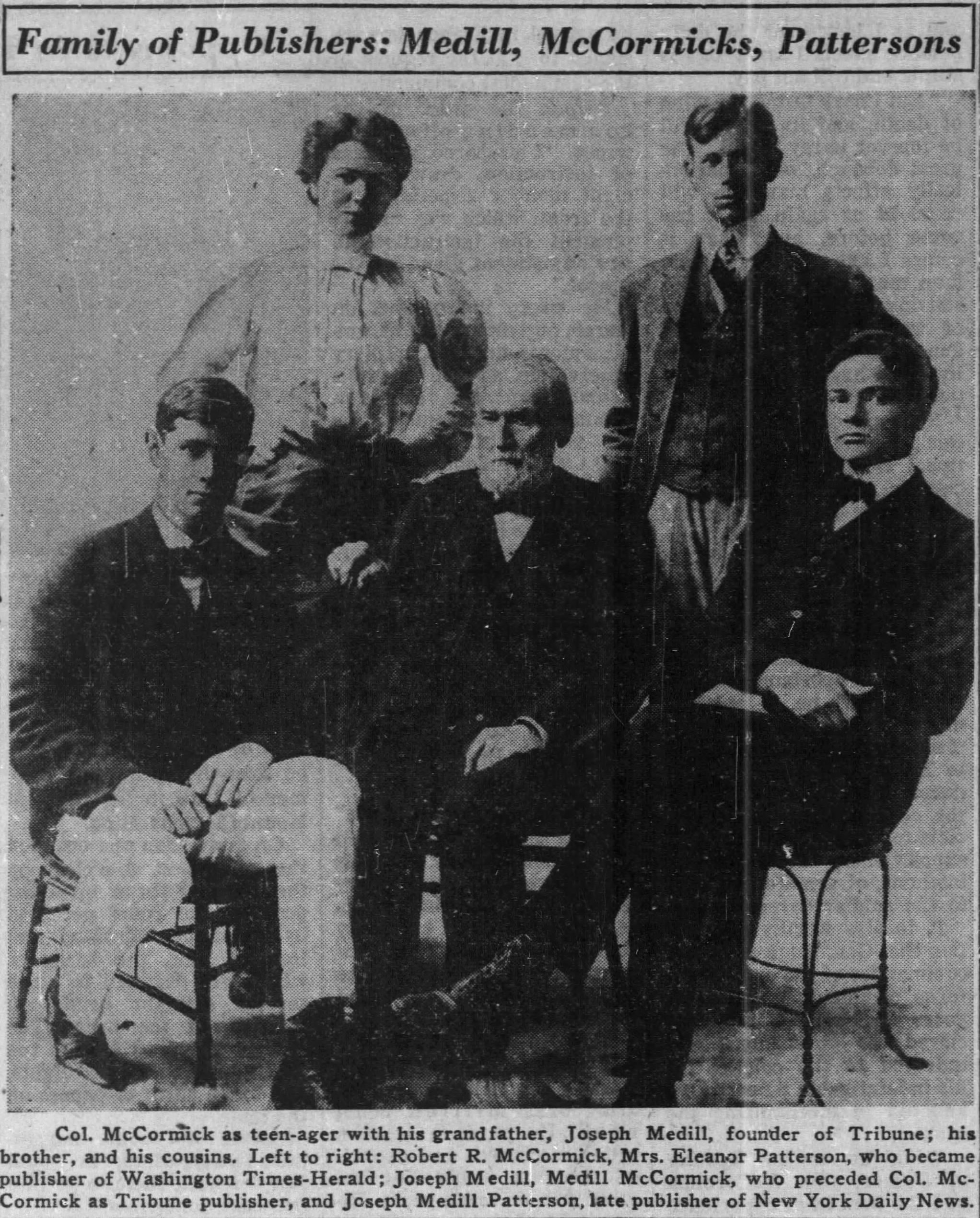
J.M.P. at right with grandfather Joseph Medill, cousins and sister, circa 1898

Medill Chicago family tree

Joseph Medill (1823–1899)	Katherine Patrick
Robert Wilson Patterson (1850–1910)	Elinor Medill (1855–1933)	Katherine van Etta Medill (1853–1932)	Robert Sanderson McCormick (1849–1919)
Joseph Medill Patterson (1879–1946)	Eleanor Josephine Medill Patterson (1884–1948)	Ruth Hanna (1880–1944)	Joseph Medill McCormick (1877–1925)	Robert Rutherford McCormick (1880–1955)
Alicia Patterson (1906–1963)	Harry Frank Guggenheim (1890–1971)	Jay Frederick Reeve (1893–1956)	Josephine Medill Patterson (1913–1996)	Ivan Le Lorraine Albright (1897–1983)	James Joseph Patterson (1923–1992)
Madeleine Jana Korbel (1937–2022)	Joseph Medill Patterson Reeve, later Albright (born 1937)	Alice Reeve, later Albright (1940–2016)	Michael J. Arlen (born 1930)
