= Josephine Patterson Albright =

American journalist

- Portrait of Josephine Patterson Albright by Ivan Albright, 1978–1979
- Born: Josephine Medill Patterson; December 2, 1913; Libertyville, Illinois
- Died: January 15, 1996 (aged 82); Woodstock, Vermont
- Occupations: Journalist, philanthropist
- Spouse(s): Jay Frederick Reeve (m. 1936; div. 1944) Ivan Albright (m. 1946; died 1983)
- Children: 4
- Father: Joseph Medill Patterson

Josephine Medill Patterson Albright (December 2, 1913 – January 15, 1996) was an American journalist.

== Life ==
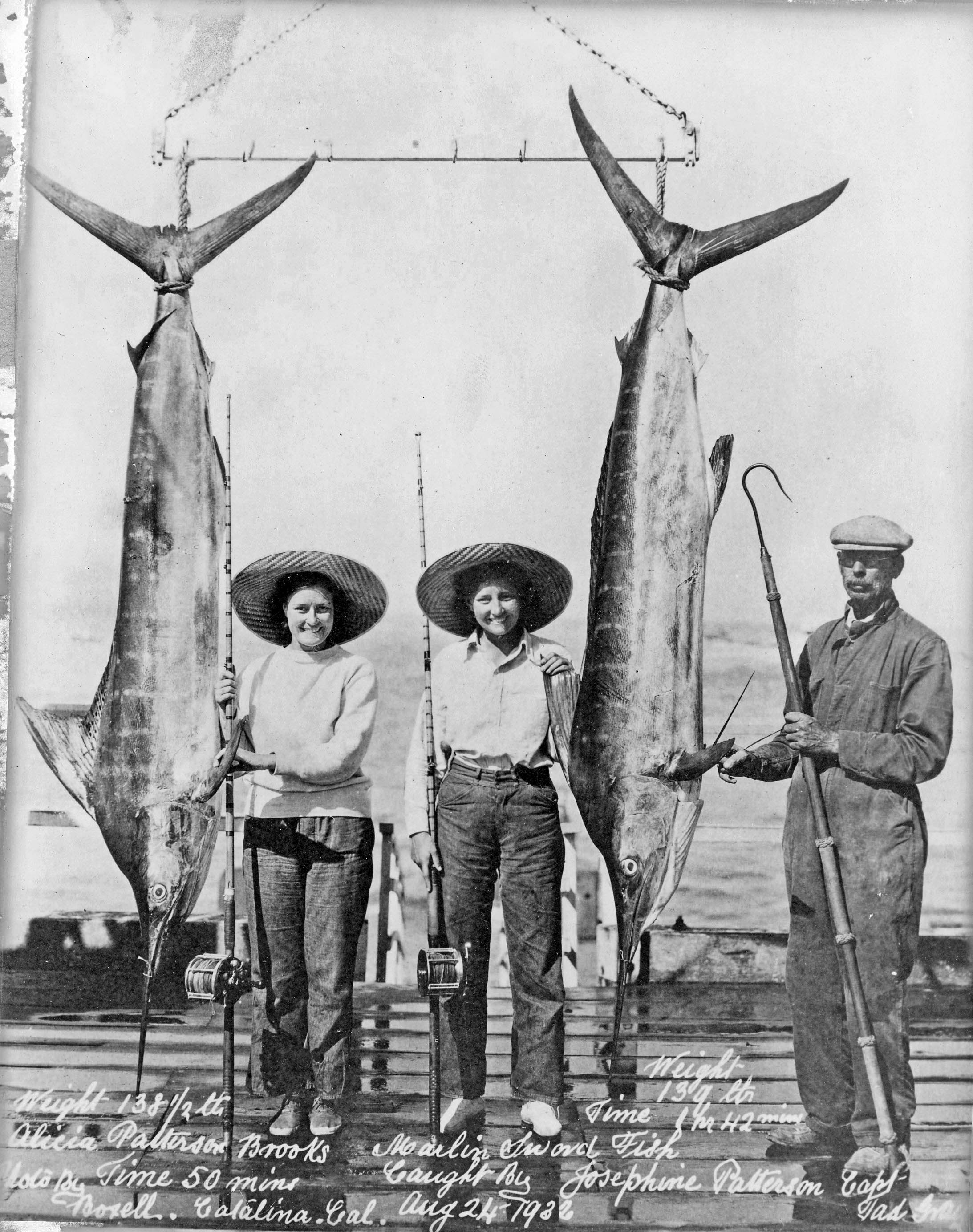
Alica (left) and Josephine (right) Patterson at Catalina Island, 1932

Josephine Medill Patterson was born on December 2, 1913, in Libertyville, Illinois to father Joseph Medill Patterson (publisher of the New York Daily News) and mother Alice Higinbotham. She was the younger sister of Elinor and Alicia, older half-sister of James, niece of Cissy Patterson, and great-granddaughter of Joseph Medill and Robert W. Patterson.

At age four, Josephine's picture was featured in a Liberty war bonds advertisement in the Chicago Tribune, having participated in a meeting at a Marshall Field's store where she read a poem in support of her father, who was serving the army in France. She also spoke and presented flowers to veterans at a Tribune war correspondent reception. When Albright was 16 years old she earned her transport pilot's license. At 19 she made her formal society debut with a dinner and a ball at the Blackstone Hotel thrown by her parents. In summer of 1933 Josephine journeyed to Murray Bay, Canada to learn about paper production. After a short career as a commercial pilot she traveled to India with her sister, Alicia Patterson, to hunt wild animals.

Albright's journalism career began with her reporting for the Chicago Daily News from 1934 to 1936. She left journalism to run a dairy and pig farm in Lake County, Illinois, that later became the Hawthorn-Mellody Dairy. On June 22, 1936 Josephine married Chicago lawyer Jay Frederick Reeve, a trial lawyer and World War I veteran pilot who had divorced his first wife, Louise Falk, with whom he had two children, the same month in Reno, Nevada. Josephine and Reeve had a son, Joseph, and daughter, Alice, by 1940. The family temporarily moved to Palm Beach, Florida, while Reeve studied at the United States Air Force Academy. The couple divorced in July 1944, with Reeve charged with cruelty for repeatedly striking his wife. Josephine was awarded custody of their two children, and Reeve remarried his ex-wife Louise less than two weeks later. Albright then raised and bred horses while living with her children at a ranch in Dubois, Wyoming.

In August 1946 she married the Chicago School artist Ivan Albright at Red Lodge, Montana, with only two witnesses, Ivan's twin brother Malvin Albright and Josephine's older sister Alicia. As a wedding gift, Ivan gave Josephine his first major artwork, "That Which I Should Have Done, I Did Not Do," which had won the Temple Gold Metal at the Metropolitan Museum of Art in 1942 and was valued at $125,000 in 1945 (over $2,000,000 adjusted for inflation). Ivan Albright also painted a portrait of her father Joseph Medill Patterson that was exhibited at the Art Institute of Chicago. In August 1947 Ivan and Josephine had a son, Adam, and in May 1949 a daughter, Blandina.

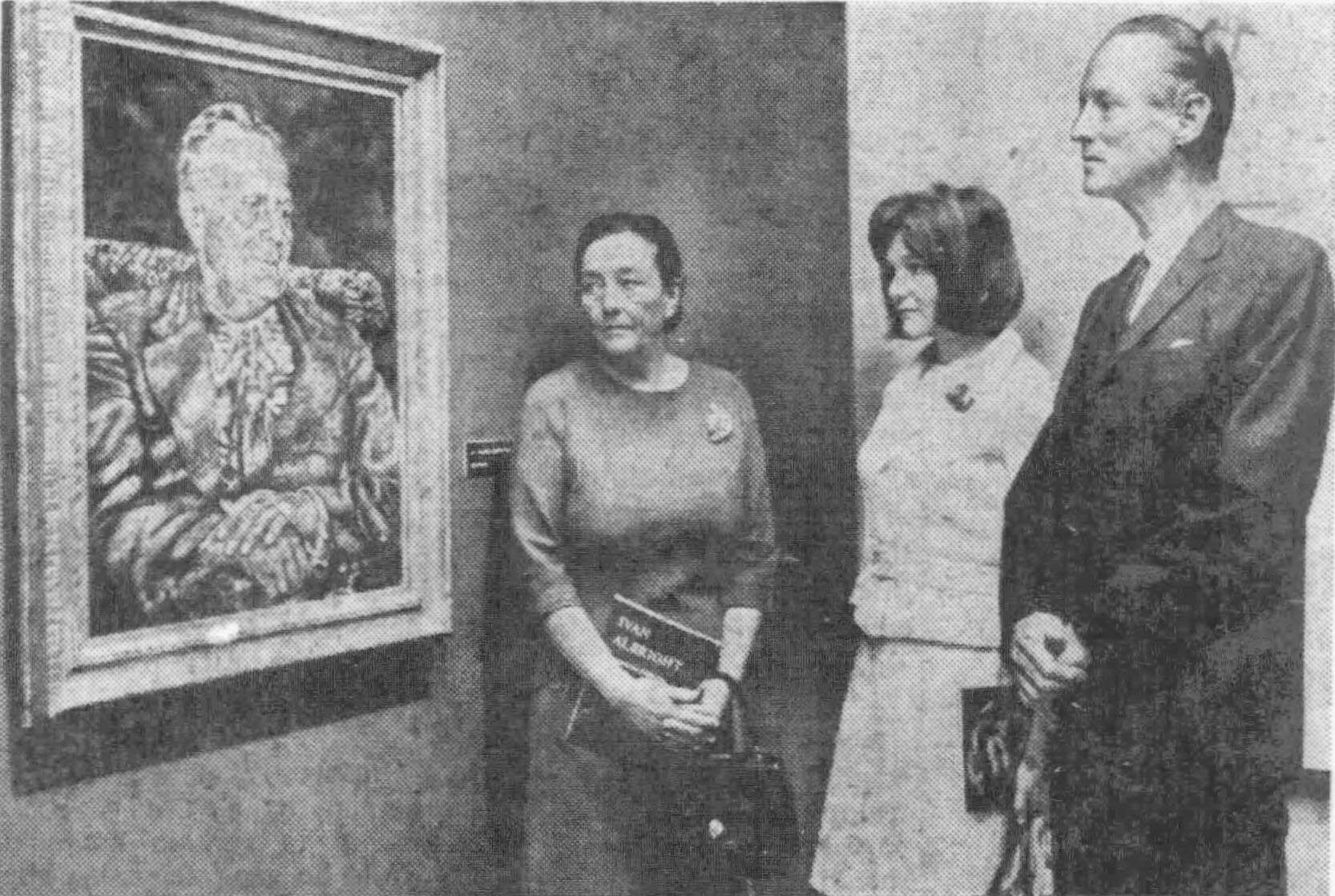
Josephine with her daughter Alice and Frederick A. Sweet, Curator, 1964

In 1949 Albright began writing a weekly column for Newsday, "Life With Junior." The column was about her life raising four children. The Albrights moved to Woodstock, Vermont in 1963. Around that time Albright earned a Bachelor of Arts degree from Goddard College in Plainfield, Vermont.

Albright helped to establish the Alicia Patterson Foundation in honor of her deceased sister Alicia. The foundation is a journalism fellowship program that is still in existence.

Ivan Albright produced several portraits of his wife. Castings of his 1954 bronze are in the Art Institute of Chicago and the Tate. A 1978 etching is in the Hood Museum of Art. Josephine Albright died of a stroke on January 15, 1996, in Woodstock, Vermont.
