= Alicia Patterson Foundation =

American journalism foundation

The Alicia Patterson Foundation (APF) program was established in 1965 in memory of Alicia Patterson, who was the editor and publisher of Newsday for nearly 23 years before her death in 1963.

== Fellowship ==
The Foundation provides competitive, one-year or half-year grants to working journalists to pursue independent projects of significant interest and to write articles based on their investigations for The APF Reporter, a quarterly magazine published by the Foundation.

The winner gets $40,000 for one year or $20,000 for half a year. They are chosen by an annual competition. Each year a panel of judges convenes in the fall to interview and choose APF fellows.

=== Criteria ===
To get a Fellowship, the journalist must have eight years of professional print experience and must be a full-time worker. Included are reporters, writers, publishers and photographers.

The competition opens in June and all entries must be postmarked by October 1. Applications are accepted from U.S. citizens who are print journalists with at least five years of professional experience.

== See also ==
- Institute for Nonprofit News (the Reporter is a member)
