= Michael J. Arlen =

American writer

Michael John Arlen (born December 9, 1930) is an American writer, primarily of non-fiction and personal history, as well as a longtime staff writer and television critic for The New Yorker.

== Early life ==
Michael John Arlen was born on December 9, 1930, in London, the son of a British-Armenian writer, Michael Arlen, and former Countess Atalanta Mercati of Athens, Greece. His early childhood was spent with his family in Cannes, in the South of France. At the outbreak of World War II, he was at boarding school in England and went with his school to join a Canadian school in Ottawa, Canada. Later he transferred to St. Paul's School, Concord, New Hampshire, after which he went to Harvard College, where he was a co-President of The Harvard Lampoon and graduated in 1952.

== Career ==
Arlen worked as a reporter on Life for five years, from 1952 to 1957, before joining the staff of The New Yorker in 1957 where he remained until 1990. His first book was Living-Room War, a collection of his television pieces centered on the Vietnam War. The book's title, a term Arlen coined, has gone on to be heavily referenced in academic and journalistic writing. His two best-known books are Exiles (focused on his childhood in the South of France) and Passage to Ararat (about his Armenian heritage), both of them personal histories that first appeared in full in The New Yorker.

== Awards ==
Exiles was short-listed for the National Book Award. Passage to Ararat won the National Book Award (Contemporary Affairs) in 1976.

== Personal life ==
Arlen has four children from his first marriage. He married a second time, to screenwriter Alice Albright, in 1972, and together they raised an extended family of seven children. Alice Albright Arlen died in 2016.

== Works ==
- Living-Room War (1969)
- An American Verdict (1974)
- Exiles (1970)
- Passage to Ararat (1975) — National Book Award, Contemporary Affairs
- The View from Highway 1 (1976)
- Thirty Seconds (1980)
- The Camera Age (1981)
- Say Goodbye to Sam (1984)
- The Huntress (2016)
