= Clayton Kirkpatrick =

American journalist

Clayton Kirkpatrick (January 8, 1915 – June 19, 2004) was an American journalist who was the editor of the Chicago Tribune newspaper from 1969 until 1979. He is credited with modernizing the Tribune, shifting its news coverage and editorial page away from reflexive partisanship and—in a famous editorial—calling for the resignation of President Richard Nixon in 1974.

== Early life and education ==
Kirkpatrick was born on January 8, 1915, and grew up in Waterman, Illinois. He was the son of an operator of a machine shop and garage. Kirkpatrick graduated in 1937 from the University of Illinois at Urbana–Champaign.

== Career ==
After itinerant jobs around the country, Kirkpatrick joined Chicago's City News Bureau in late January 1938. Kirkpatrick had hoped for a job at the Chicago Daily News but instead joined the Tribune in 1938, where his first jobs were as a general-assignment reporter and then covering the federal courts.

In 1942, Kirkpatrick enlisted in the United States Army, working in Army intelligence and mostly spending his time stationed in England. Kirkpatrick rose up to become a master sergeant was awarded the Bronze Star. He was discharged in November 1945.

Kirkpatrick spent 15 years as a reporter at the Tribune before becoming a copy editor in 1954. He then served as make-up editor, chief of the neighborhood news sections and an assignment editor. More promotions followed, as Kirkpatrick was named city editor in 1961, assistant managing editor in 1963, managing editor in 1965 and executive editor in 1967. Kirkpatrick was named the Tribune's editor on January 1, 1969. He immediately replaced the Tribune's partisan writing and reporting with balanced, objective coverage.

Kirkpatrick also altered the design and layout of the Tribune, adding new sections geared toward reader interests. The changes wound up influencing the broader newspaper world. In February 1974, Time magazine named the Tribune one of the nation's 10 best newspapers.

== Watergate ==
In 1974, Kirkpatrick sought for the Tribune to become the first newspaper to publish the Watergate scandal transcripts in their entirety. Kirkpatrick and the Tribune's Washington reporters negotiated with Nixon's press secretary, Ron Ziegler, to get the transcripts early and then fly the transcripts on a company jet to Chicago, where a task force quickly prepared them for publication. They were published in a 44-page special section.

One week later, Kirkpatrick, who previously had been a Nixon supporter, concluded after reading the transcripts that the Tribune should call for Nixon's resignation. He authored a May 9, 1974, editorial that used uncharacteristically blunt language in stating that it was time for Nixon to resign. "We saw the public man in his first administration, and we were impressed. Now in about 300,000 words we have seen the private man, and we are appalled", the editorial read. "The key word here is immoral. It is a lack of concern for morality, a lack of concern for high principles, a lack of commitment to the high ideals of public office that make the transcripts a sickening exposure of the man and his advisers ... He is humorless to the point of being inhumane. He is devious. He is vacillating. He is profane. He is willing to be led. He displays dismaying gaps in knowledge. He is suspicious of his staff. His loyalty is minimal." The editorial concluded: "The President is right in urging a quick end to the Watergate affair. His country needs a swift and merciful termination of this agony. Two roads are open. One is resignation. The other is impeachment. Both are legitimate and would satisfy the need to observe due process."

That the editorial came from the Tribune—a paper that long had been synonymous with Republican politics—made it especially influential both in the U.S. and overseas.

== Later life ==
In 1979, Kirkpatrick was promoted to become president and CEO of the Tribune Company. He retired on June 1, 1981.

After retiring, Kirkpatrick, an enthusiastic golfer, served on the board of the Cantigny Trust and urged his fellow board members to approve plans for the Cantigny Golf Club, a 27-hole golf course on the grounds of the estate of former Tribune publisher Robert R. McCormick.

== Personal ==
Kirkpatrick was married to Thelma Kirkpatrick for 55 years until her death in 1998. He had four children and lived in Glen Ellyn, Illinois.

Kirkpatrick died of congestive heart failure at his home on June 19, 2004.
