= Neal Blair =

American biogeochemist and academic

Neal E. Blair is an American biogeochemist and academic, serving as a professor of civil and environmental engineering and of Earth sciences at Northwestern University. His research focuses on the global carbon cycle, biogeochemistry, and the environmental impacts of land use and climate change.

== Early life and education ==
Blair grew up in rural Maryland and was the first in his family to attend college. He earned a Bachelor of Science in chemistry from the University of Maryland, College Park, and later obtained a Ph.D. in chemistry from Stanford University. His early academic interests in chemistry and the natural environment led him to specialize in geochemistry and biogeochemistry.

== Career and research ==
Blair is a faculty member at Northwestern University, with joint appointments in the McCormick School of Engineering and the Weinberg College of Arts and Sciences. He is affiliated with the Department of Civil and Environmental Engineering and the Department of Earth, Environmental, and Planetary Sciences.

His research centers on the biogeochemical cycling of carbon, including the sources, transport, and fate of organic carbon in terrestrial and aquatic systems. He has studied how human activities such as agriculture and deforestation affect the movement of carbon across landscapes and into oceans and geological reservoirs.

Blair’s work also explores methane production in natural environments and the role of soils and microorganisms in carbon sequestration. In addition, he has investigated the conversion of waste materials into biofuels, including biodiesel derived from organic waste streams.

== Public engagement and media ==
Blair has contributed to public discussions on climate science and environmental issues, discussing them with the Chicago Tribune in a 2019 interview.

He has also been featured in university publications highlighting faculty research and interdisciplinary work related to sustainability and climate change.
