= Cantigny Park =

Illinois public gardens, museums, and golf course

Cantigny
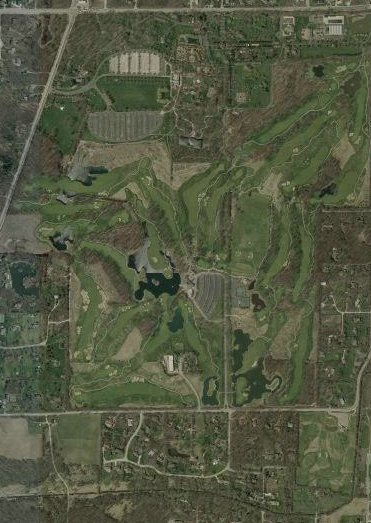
- Cantigny, with its non-contiguous Family Links Golf Course in the bottom right.
- Interactive map of Cantigny
- Nearest city: Wheaton, Illinois
- Coordinates: 41°51′17″N 88°09′21″W
- Area: 500 acres (200 ha)
- Created: 1955
- Operator: McCormick Foundation
- Open: February–December
- Website: cantigny.org

Cantigny (/kænˈtiːni/ kan-TEE-nee) is a 500-acre (200 ha) park in Wheaton, Illinois, 30 miles (48 km) west of Chicago. It is the former estate of Joseph Medill and his grandson, Colonel Robert R. McCormick, publishers of the Chicago Tribune. Open to the public from February through December, Cantigny comprises expansive formal and informal gardens, a historic Georgian-style brick house, a military museum, a visitor center with cafe, a picnic grove with pavilion, an outdoor playground, hiking paths, and a 27-hole golf course with driving range, pro-shop, and restaurant.

Cantigny attracts more than 330,000 people per year. Visitors may watch a short welcome and orientation film inside the visitor center to learn about the park's origin, history, people, and present-day features. The visitor center also includes an interpretive wall exhibit, an in-ground scaled model of the 500-acre property, the Medill cafe, and Le Jardin, a caterer-ready facility for lectures, events, and rentals.

Concerts, lectures, workshops, festivals, and other events are held at Cantigny throughout the year. Among the site's signature events are a summertime Jazz and Wine Festival, Fall Fest in late September, and Christmas at Cantigny from late November to early January. Cantigny is a common place for weddings, outdoor photography, and banquets. School field trip excursions and youth group camping are also offered.

== Origins ==
The land was acquired by Joseph Medill as a country estate, which he called Red Oaks, in the late 1800s. After his death, the estate passed to his grandson, Colonel Robert R. McCormick. McCormick served in World War I and saw action at the Battle of Cantigny in northern France. After returning home, he renamed the estate Cantigny in honor of the battle.

McCormick had no children. When he died in 1955, he left his fortune to establish the McCormick Charitable Trust (now the McCormick Foundation). He also directed that Cantigny should be transformed into a park for the use of the general public. Since then, the McCormick Foundation has used the endowment funds bequeathed by McCormick to operate Cantigny as a public facility.

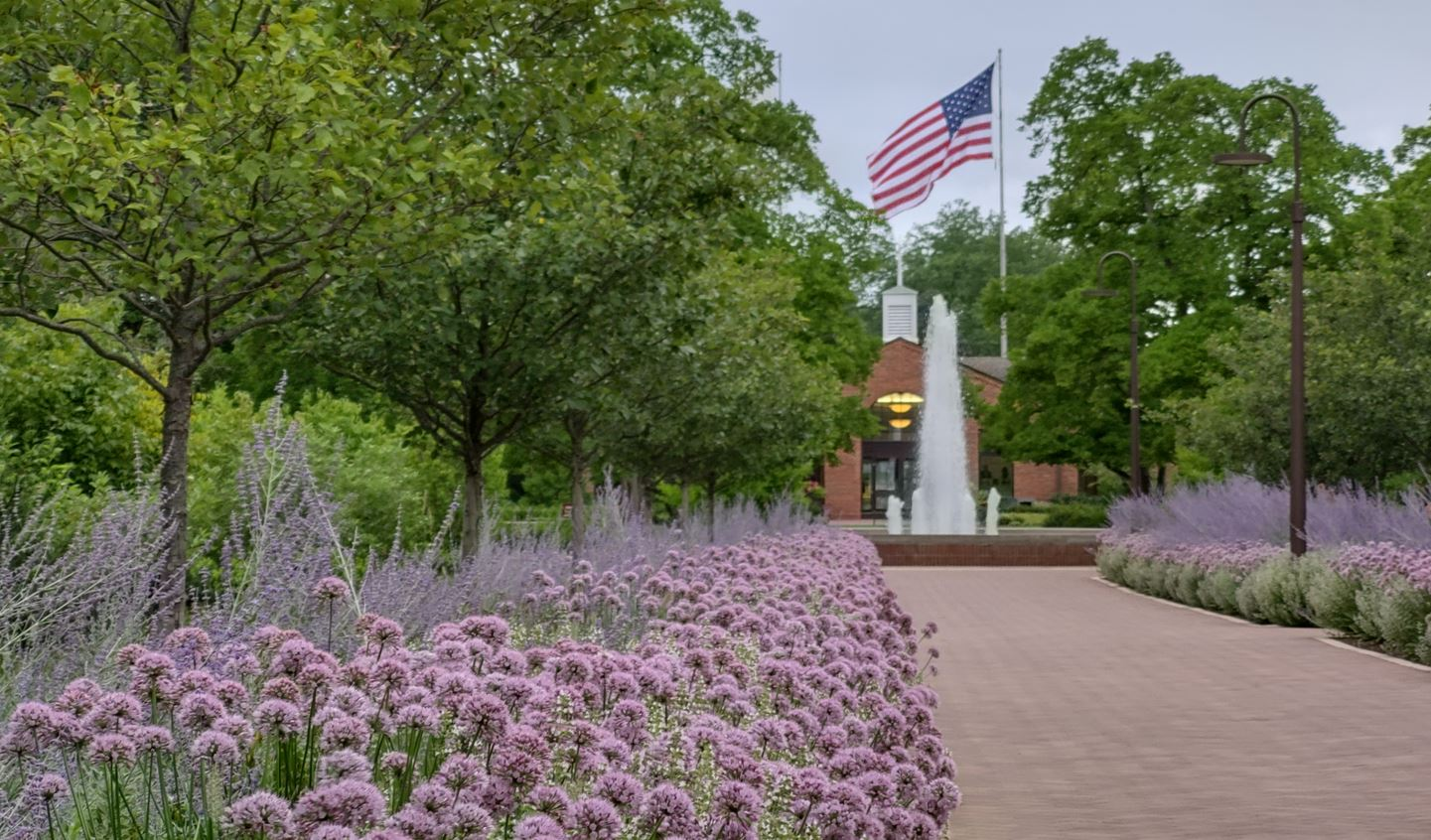
Ornamental onions and Russian sage flowers in late July along the Hawthorn Path. The Fountain Garden and Visitor Center are in the distance.

== Robert R. McCormick House ==
In 1896–1897, Joseph Medill built a 35-room mansion on the estate; it was designed by architect Charles Allerton Coolidge. It underwent renovation and restoration, which was completed in 2023. Today, the mansion is the Robert R. McCormick House, a historic house which is used as offices and event rental space. The mansion is open to the public only on select dates as part of Cantigny's special event schedule.

Among the noteworthy rooms on the first floor are Freedom Hall, an Art Deco-style hidden service bar, the Drawing Room, and the Dining Room. These rooms feature original McCormick-era artifacts, including paintings, swords, library books, and wallpaper. The second floor is an exhibit space.

== First Division Museum ==
During World War I, McCormick served with the First Division of the United States Army—also known as the "Big Red One". McCormick provided an endowment for the First Division Museum, which was designed by architect Andrew Rebori. The museum has exhibits and artifacts chronicling the First Division's service history in World War I, World War II, and later U.S. wars.

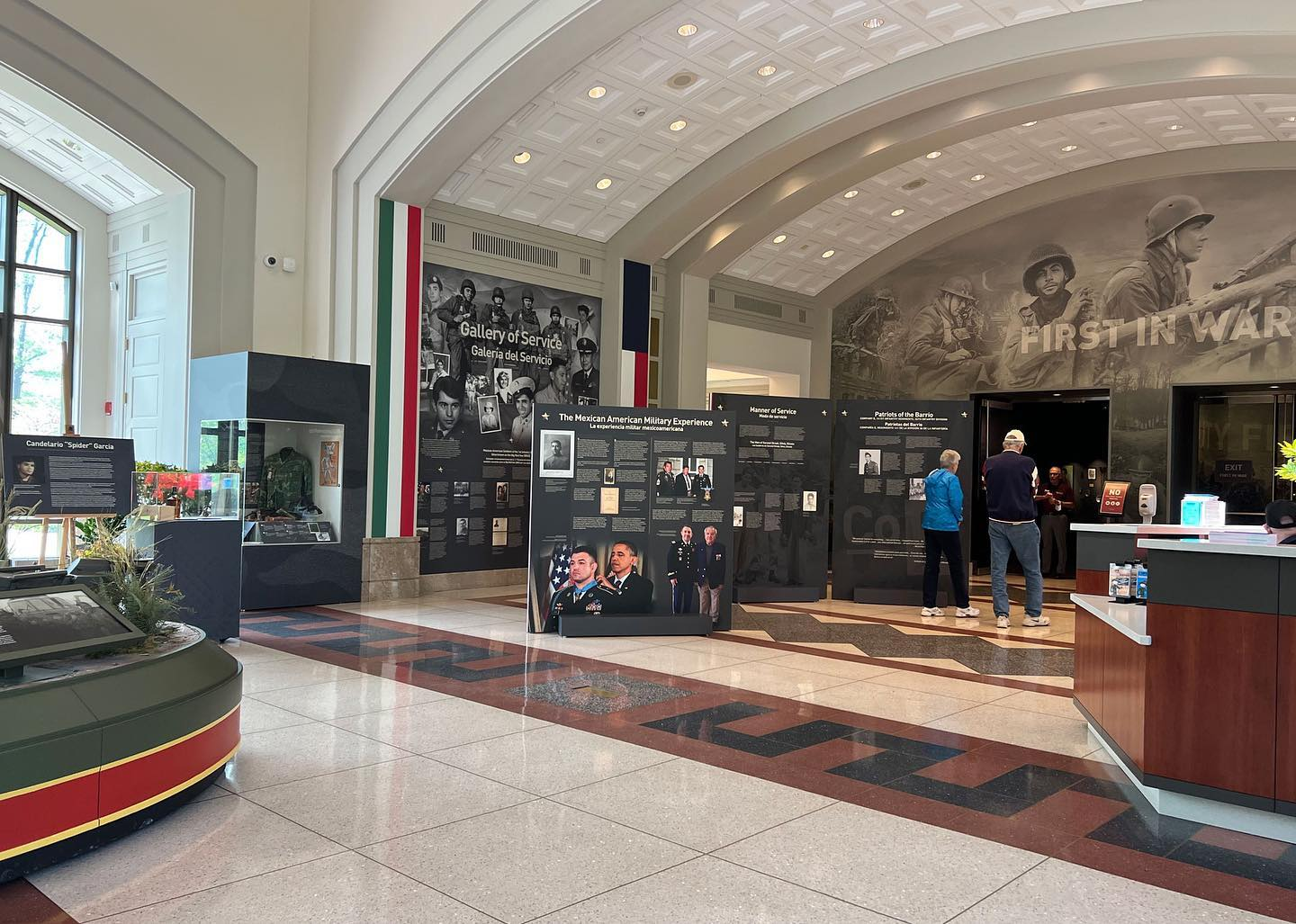
Permanent and temporary exhibits await visitors inside the First Division Museum at Cantigny.

On display outside the museum is the area's largest collection of tanks and artillery pieces, known as the "Tank Park". The collection includes tanks and armored vehicles from the First World War up to the present day. Visitors are allowed to climb on the vehicles.

The museum's "Date with History" series features guest speakers on subjects of interest to the general public and military historians in particular. Speakers include historians, authors, filmmakers and veterans. The presentations are generally open to the public and free of charge.

The museum is also home to the McCormick Research Center, for use by authors, scholars, teachers and students. The center's archives contain more than 10,000 works on military history, including secondary works on various battles, campaigns and wars. Included in the primary works are the bound battle records of the First Division in World War I, and the 1st Infantry Division's World War II battle records on microfilm. The center's Reading Room is open to the public.

== Public gardens ==
The Cantigny estate includes ornamental landscapes and gardens covering about 30 acres. Its features include the Rose and White Gardens, Rock and Gravel Gardens, Logarium, Perennial Border, Hawthorn Path and nearby Fountain Garden and the Idea Garden, designed to educate and inspire home gardeners. The original design of the gardens was the work of German-American landscape architect Franz Lipp. Cantigny is renowned for its extravagant annual plant displays from April to October, centered in the Upper and Lower Formal Gardens, Octagon Garden, Idea Garden, and in the 'canoe beds' in the Colonnade outside the visitor center building.

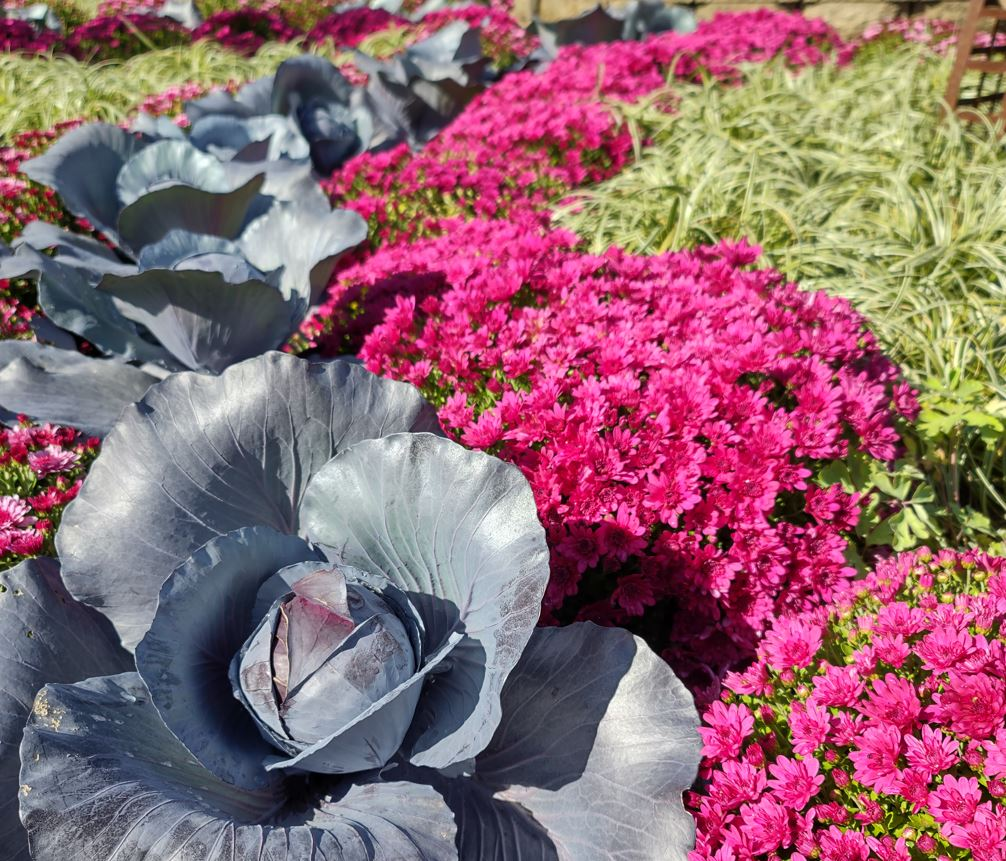
Known for its annual flower displays, Cantigny grows purpleleaf cabbage, chrysanthemums and variegated sedge in this fall garden bed.

Located in USDA Plant Hardiness Zone 5b, plants across Cantigny come out of their winter dormancy beginning in late March. Mid- to late April is the peak of spring floral color with magnolias, viburnums, and tulips. The peak of summer color from annual plants is August, with cool-season plants such as mums, kale, and pansies on display from mid-September to Halloween. Peak fall foliage color is usually around the second to fourth week of October and varies each year depending on the weather regime.

McCormick and his first wife, Amy, are buried on the grounds. The elaborate gravesite, near the mansion, is known as the Exedra and was designed by Chicago architect Andrew Rebori.

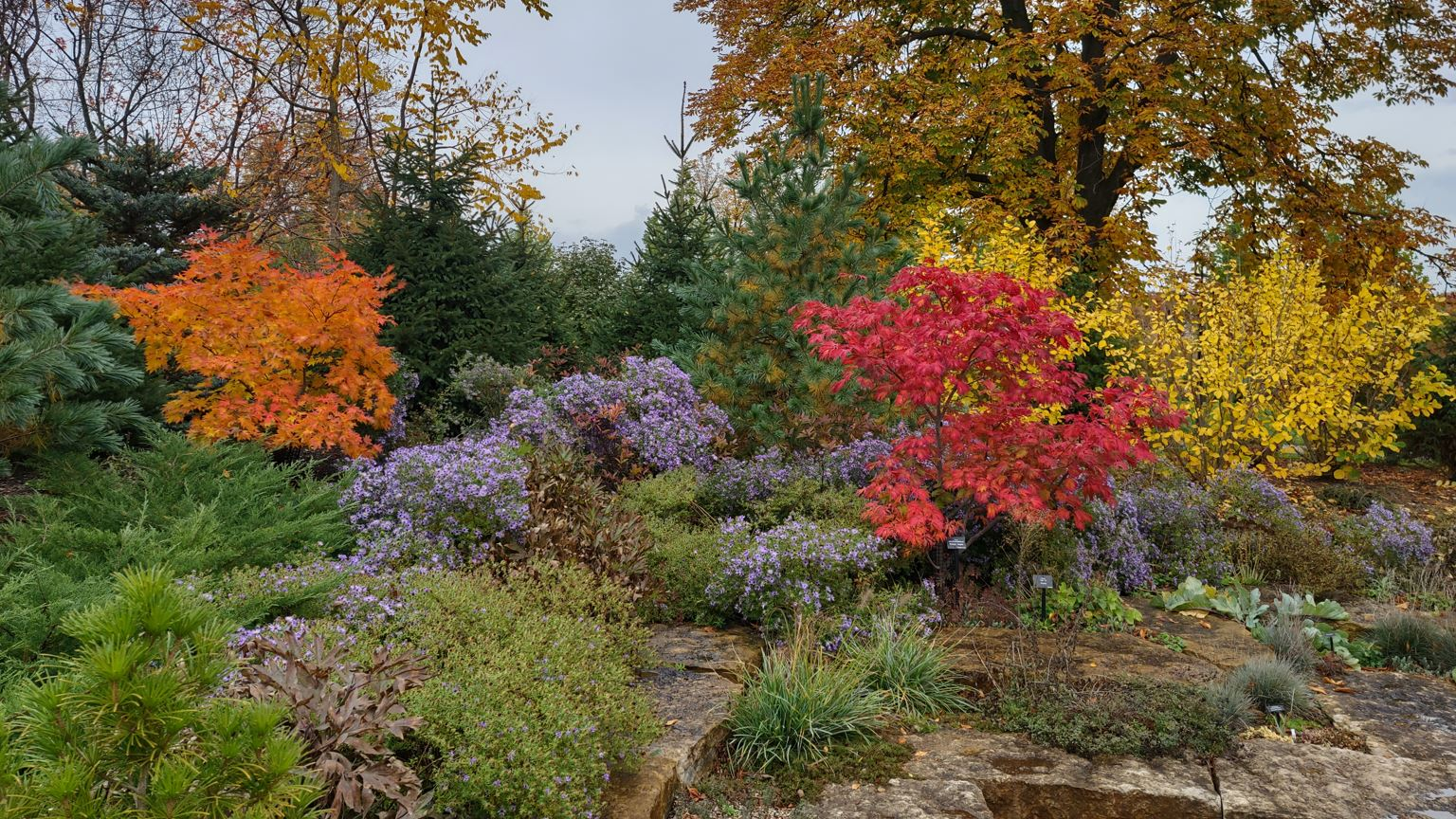
Fall splendor of Japanese maples, witchhazels and purple asters in Cantigny's Rock Garden in mid-October

== Golf ==
Cantigny Golf Club, owned by the Chicago-based Robert R. McCormick Foundation and managed by KemperSports (Northbrook, Ill.), celebrated 25 years in 2014. When it opened in 1989, Golf Digest named Cantigny the "Best New Public Course in America". Cantigny hosted the 2007 U.S. Amateur Public Links Championship, four Illinois State Amateur Championships (most recently in 2014), and the Chicago Open in 2013 and 2014. The 300-acre Cantigny Golf complex includes 27 holes designed by Roger Packard, the year-round Cantigny Golf Academy, the 9-hole Cantigny Youth Links, and a clubhouse with dining and banquet facilities.

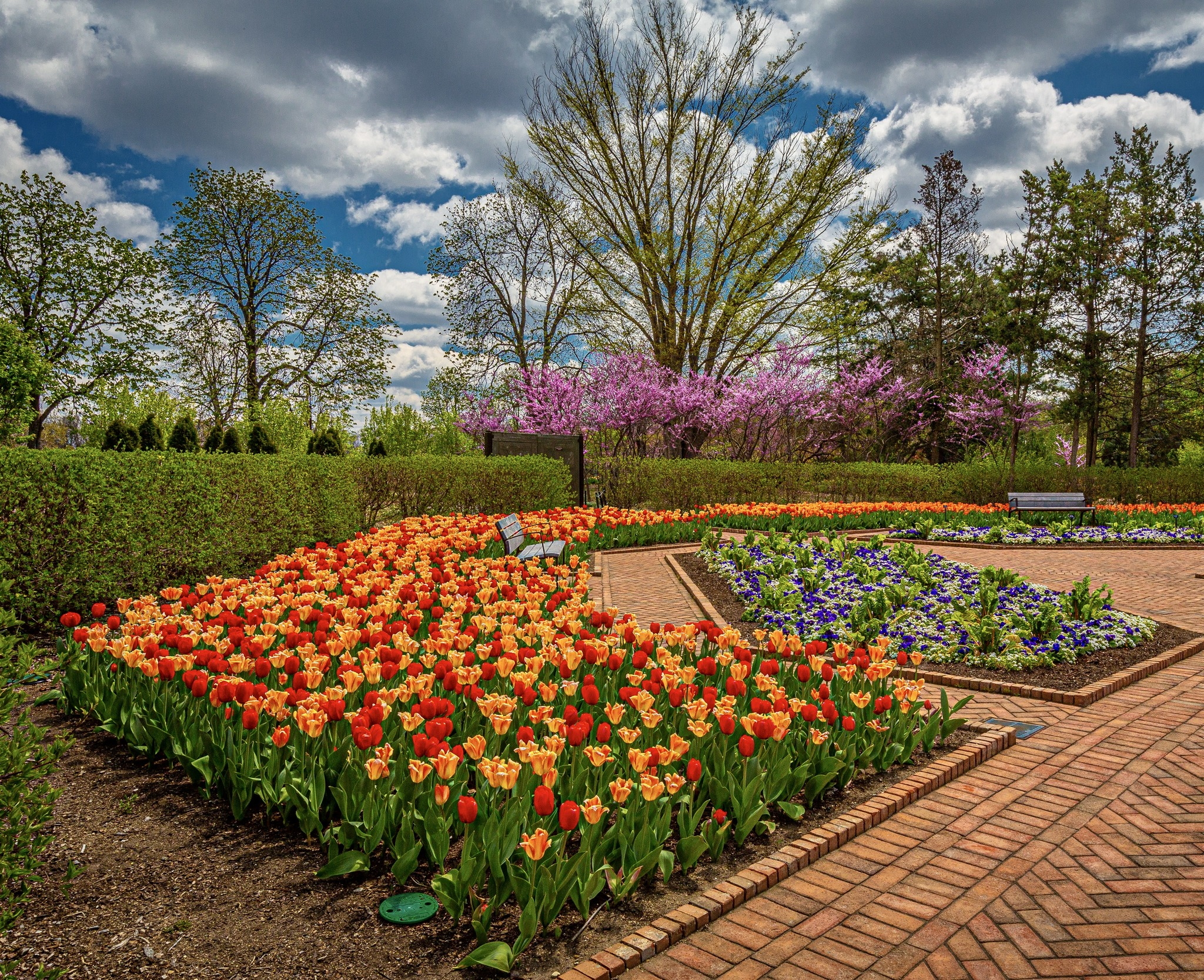
The Octagon Garden with thousands of tulips in very late April is a visitor favorite.

== Film ==
The McCormick House and adjacent East Lawn Terraces were used for filming a scene in A League of Their Own (1992). Two other movies, Richie Rich (1994) and Baby's Day Out (1994), also include scenes from outside the mansion.

== Location ==
Cantigny is located in Wheaton, Illinois, at 1s151 Winfield Road, south of Illinois Route 38 (Roosevelt Road). The entrance to Cantigny Golf is 27w270 Mack Road, also in Wheaton.

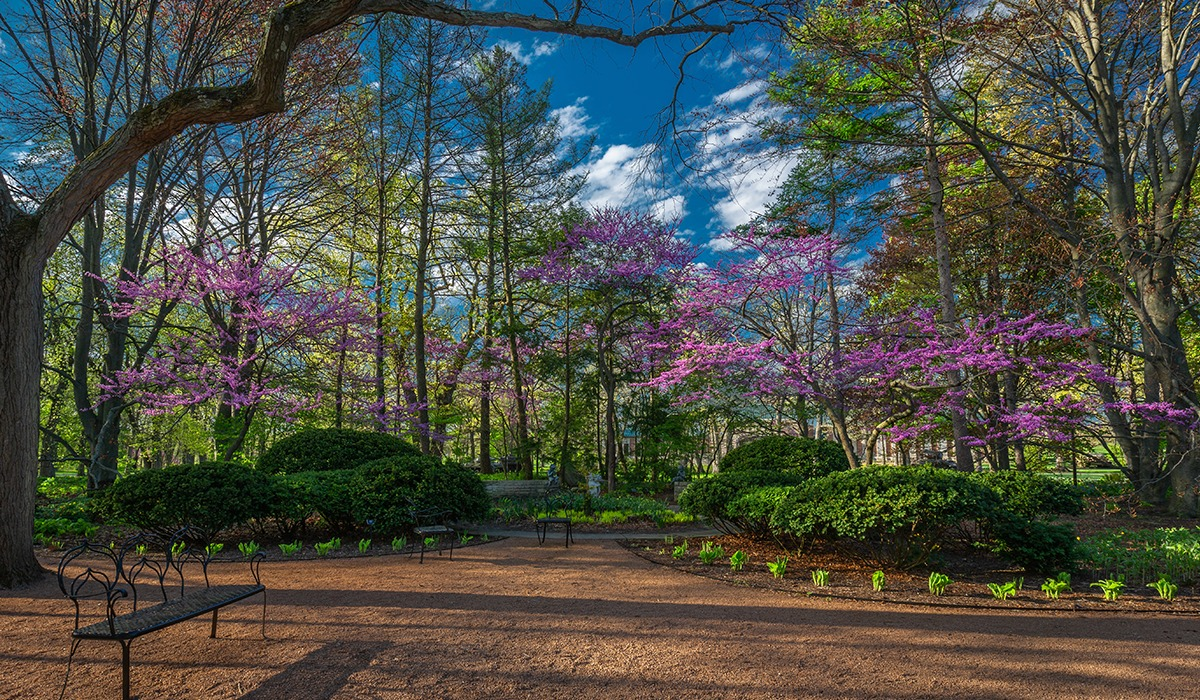
The Keyhole Garden's sylvan surroundings including eastern redbuds flowering in early May.
