= Christopher Schuh =

American materials scientist and engineer

Christopher A. Schuh
- Christopher Schuh
- Born: 1975 (age 50–51)
- Occupations: Materials scientist; academic administrator
- Known for: Nanocrystalline alloys; grain-boundary engineering; shape-memory ceramics
- Title: Dean of the McCormick School of Engineering; John G. Searle Professor of Materials Science and Engineering
- Awards: Presidential Early Career Award for Scientists and Engineers (2003; presented 2004); National Academy of Engineering member (2019); National Academy of Inventors fellow (2019); Materials Research Society fellow (2026)

Academic background
- Education: University of Illinois Urbana-Champaign (BS, 1997); Northwestern University (PhD, 2001)
- Thesis: Mechanisms and Mechanics of Transformation-Mismatch Plasticity in Titanium Alloys and Composites (2001)
- Doctoral advisor: David Dunand

Academic work
- Discipline: Materials science; metallurgy
- Institutions: Northwestern University (2023–present); Massachusetts Institute of Technology (2002–2023)
- Website: schuh.northwestern.edu

Christopher A. Schuh (born August 4, 1975) is an American materials scientist and engineer. He is the dean of Northwestern University’s McCormick School of Engineering since August 1, 2023, and the John G. Searle Professor of Materials Science and Engineering. His work has contributed to the understanding of nanocrystalline alloys, grain-boundary engineering, shape-memory materials, and microparticle impacts.

Schuh was previously a professor at the Massachusetts Institute of Technology, where he served as head of the Department of Materials Science and Engineering from 2011 to 2020. He was elected as a member into the National Academy of Engineering in 2019 for contributions to design science and application of nanocrystalline metals.

== Early life and education ==
Schuh was born on August 4, 1975. He earned his Bachelor of Science from the University of Illinois at Urbana–Champaign before attending Northwestern University's Robert R. McCormick School of Engineering and Applied Science for his PhD with Prof. David Dunand.

He held an Ernest O. Lawrence postdoctoral fellowship at Lawrence Livermore National Laboratory from 2001 to 2002, before moving to MIT.

== Career ==
Schuh became an assistant professor in MIT's Department of Materials Science and Engineering in 2002. He was promoted to associate professor without tenure in 2005 and received tenure in 2007. At MIT, he held the Salapatas Professorship of Metallurgy and subsequently the POSCO Professorship of Materials Science and Engineering.

He headed MIT's Department of Materials Science and Engineering from 2011 to 2020, succeeding interim department head Carl Thompson. In 2023, he succeeded Julio M. Ottino as dean of Northwestern's McCormick School, becoming its first alumnus to hold the position. He also holds a visiting professorship at MIT.

== Research ==
=== Nanocrystalline metals ===
Schuh's work at MIT included the development of nanocrystalline nickel–tungsten coatings as alternatives to hard chromium plating. The research addressed the stability and wear resistance of fine-grained metallic coatings and led to an electroplating process commercialized by Xtalic.

In 2012, Schuh, Tongjai Chookajorn, and Heather A. Murdoch reported a thermodynamic framework for designing nanocrystalline alloys that resist grain growth. They used the framework to identify and produce a tungsten–titanium alloy with greater thermal stability than nanocrystalline tungsten. The work, published in Science, incorporated the behavior of alloying elements at grain boundaries into alloy design.

=== Shape-memory ceramics ===
Schuh has also investigated shape-memory ceramics, which can recover deformation through reversible changes in crystal structure. In 2013, he and collaborators at MIT and Nanyang Technological University demonstrated shape-memory and superelastic behavior in small zirconia specimens containing few crystal grains. This structure reduced the internal stresses associated with the transformation and allowed deformation that would ordinarily cause cracking in larger polycrystalline specimens.

In 2022, Schuh and collaborators reported a method for designing zirconia-based shape-memory ceramics with reduced thermal hysteresis, the difference between transformation temperatures during heating and cooling. Their approach combined computational thermodynamics, data science, and crystallographic modeling to select ceramic compositions.

=== Microparticle impacts ===
Schuh's research on high-velocity microparticle impacts examines the conditions under which particles rebound from, adhere to, or erode a surface. In a 2018 study with Mostafa Hassani-Gangaraj, David Veysset, and Keith A. Nelson, he used time-resolved observations of individual impacts to identify melting as the mechanism driving erosion in the metallic systems examined. The work relates to particle deposition in cold-spray manufacturing and to impact damage.

== Commercialization ==
Schuh has co-founded several companies based on metallurgy and manufacturing research. Xtalic commercialized nanostructured metallic coatings developed in his laboratory, including coatings used in electronic connectors. He was among the founders of Desktop Metal in 2015, which developed metal additive-manufacturing systems.

In 2022, he co-founded Foundation Alloy with Jake Guglin, Jasper Lienhard, and Tim Rupert. The company develops metal alloys and manufacturing processes using technologies originating at MIT and the University of California, Irvine.

== Honors ==
Schuh received a 2003 Presidential Early Career Award for Scientists and Engineers, presented at the White House in September 2004.

The University of Illinois Urbana-Champaign's materials science and engineering department gave him its Young Alumnus Award in 2009 and its Distinguished Merit Alumni Award in 2022. MIT named him a MacVicar Faculty Fellow in 2011 in recognition of undergraduate teaching. That year he also received SAE International's Ralph R. Teetor Education Award.

In 2019, he was elected to the National Academy of Engineering and named a fellow of the National Academy of Inventors. He was selected for the Materials Research Society's 2026 class of fellows, recognizing his research on nanocrystalline materials, micromechanics, and shape-memory ceramics, together with his professional leadership.
