= Mount Airy Mansion =

Historic house in Maryland

- Mount Airy Mansion, 2026
- Interactive map of the Mount Airy Mansion area

General information
- Location: 9640 Rosaryville Road, Rosaryville State Park, Upper Marlboro, Maryland
- Coordinates: 38.775971620333756°N 76.81893998819994°W

The Mount Airy Mansion is a historic building near Upper Marlboro in Prince George's County, Maryland. Expanded c. 1751 on the site of the 17th century hunting lodge of Charles Calvert, 3rd Baron Baltimore by his great-grandson Benedict Swingate Calvert, the mansion today is managed by the Maryland Department of Natural Resources within the Rosaryville State Park.

== History ==
In 1774, Benedict Calvert's daughter Eleanor Calvert (1758–1811), married John Parke Custis, son of Martha Washington and the stepson of George Washington, who attended their wedding celebrations at Mount Airy Mansion.

After leaving the Calvert family in 1902, the house was ultimately restored by the notable newspaper editor, owner, and publisher Cissy Patterson who bought what had been termed "Dower House" from the Duvall family in 1931 shortly after a fire.

== See also ==
- Colonial families of Maryland
