= Rosaryville State Park =

Historic site in Rosaryville, Maryland, U.S.

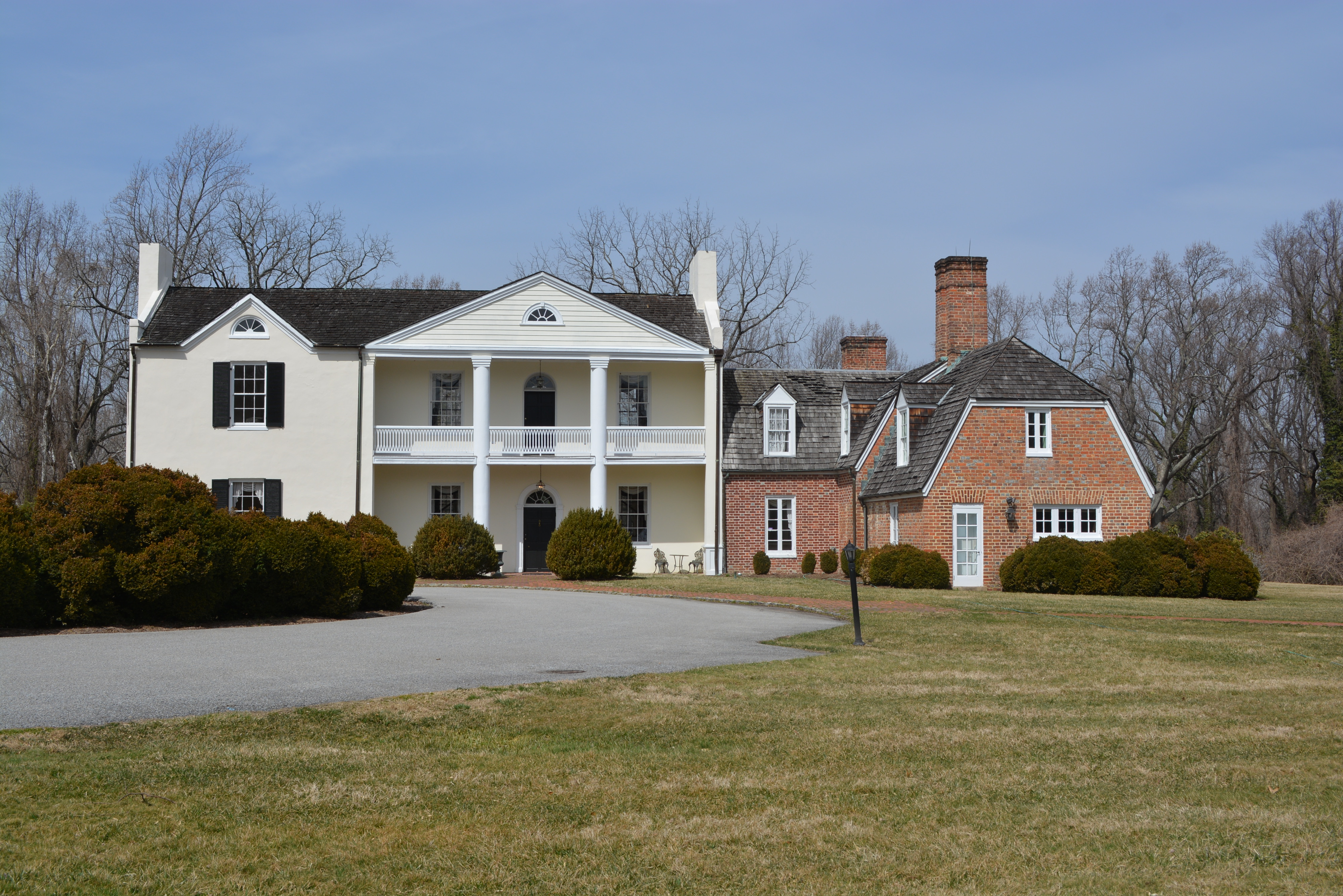
- Mount Airy Mansion, Rosaryville State Park, 2016

- Location within Maryland
- Location: Rosaryville, Maryland, United States
- Coordinates: 38°46′27″N 76°48′40″W
- Area: 1,227 acres (497 ha)
- Elevation: 161 ft (49 m)
- Established: 1976
- Administrator: Maryland Department of Natural Resources
- Designation: Maryland state park
- Website: Official website

Rosaryville State Park is a Maryland state park with historical features located three miles southeast of Joint Base Andrews (formerly Andrews Air Force Base) in Rosaryville, Prince George's County, Maryland. The park includes the restored Mount Airy Mansion, which was formerly operated as an event facility, as well as hiking, biking and equestrian trails for day-use.

== History ==
Calvert family

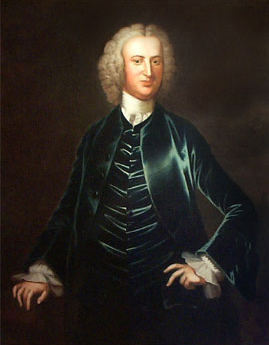
Benedict Swingate Calvert, painted by John Wollaston c1754. Calvert and his family lived at Mount Airey mansion, now a part of Rosaryville State Park.

Benedict Swingate Calvert, (c.1730-1788), son of Charles Calvert, fifth Baron Baltimore, lived at Mount Airy, and died there on January 9, 1788. Calvert was a politician and planter in colonial Maryland. Mount Airy was most likely a gift from his father, Lord Baltimore, who had ensured that Calvert would be provided with lands and revenues, and Mount Airy had originally been a hunting lodge for Charles Calvert, third Baron Baltimore. Calvert began construction of his house, which still survives, in 1751.

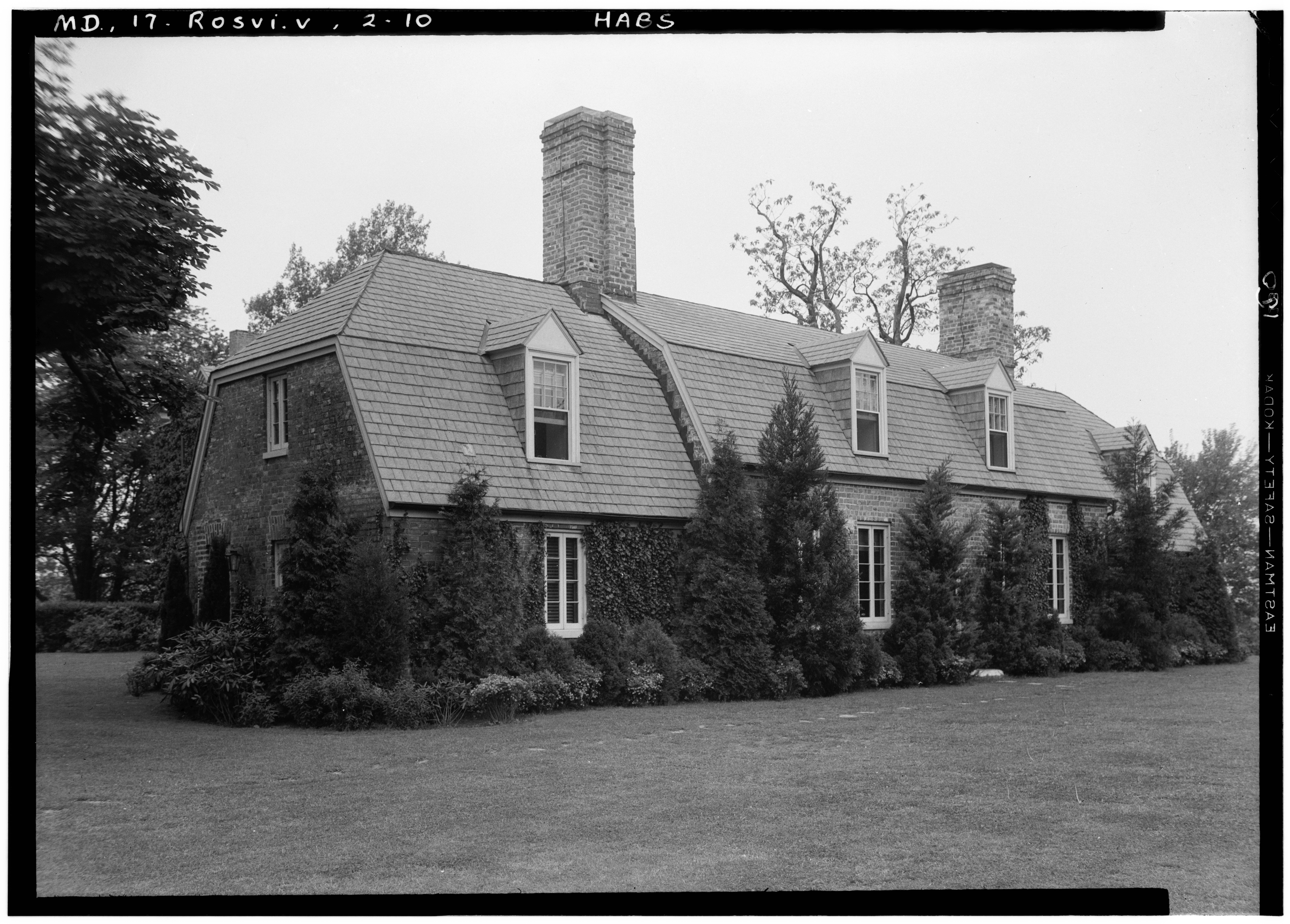
Mount Airy ca. 1936

In 1774, Calvert's daughter Eleanor Calvert (1758–1811), married John Parke Custis, son of Martha Washington and the stepson of George Washington. Washington himself did not approve of the match owing to the couple's youth, but eventually gave his consent, and was present at the wedding celebrations, which took place at Mount Airy. The couple's son, George Washington Parke Custis, who was born at Mount Airy in 1781, built and named Arlington House near the Potomac River, married Mary Lee Fitzhugh, and became the father-in-law of Robert E. Lee. By the 1770s Benedict Swingate Calvert controlled a large and profitable estate of around 4,000 acres (1,600 ha), with upwards of 150 slaves. He was also an enthusiastic horse breeder, training thoroughbreds and running them in competitions in Maryland and Virginia. Benedict Swingate Calvert died at Mount Airy on January 9, 1788. He was buried beneath the chancel of the church of St Thomas in Croom, Maryland, a church which Calvert had helped to found and maintain. His wife died ten years later, in 1798.

Benedict Calvert's second son Edward Henry Calvert, who was born on November 7, 1766, then inherited the estate. He married on March 1, 1796, and died on July 12, 1846. He left the estate to his widow, who died on March 26, 1857. On her death the estate, by this time reduced to around 1,000 acres (400 ha), was to be divided among her children. Two of her children were the last Calvert owners. After the death of "Old Miss Eleanor" the house and its contents were sold at auction.

Twentieth century

Matilda Duvall purchased the property in 1902, ending the Calvert family's hereditary ownership. Renamed as Dower House, it became a country inn until a fire in 1931 reduced the building to only its masonry walls. The ruins were purchased and restored by socialite Cissy Patterson, the publisher of the Washington Times-Herald, who entertained presidents and other important persons here. She in turn bequeathed the property to Ann Bowie Smith, and it was from her family that the State of Maryland purchased Mt. Airy, in 1973, to add it to Rosaryville State Park. It is operated as an event facility by the Rosaryville Conservancy and a private concessionaire.

In 1976, Peter and Esther D. Duvall deeded their 341-acre (138 ha) property, including the 274 acres (111 ha) of Mount Airy, to the Maryland Department of Natural Resources, which established Rosaryville State Park on the site.
