= Northwestern Technological Institute =

Building at Northwestern University

Coordinates: 42°3′28.2″N 87°40′33.1″W

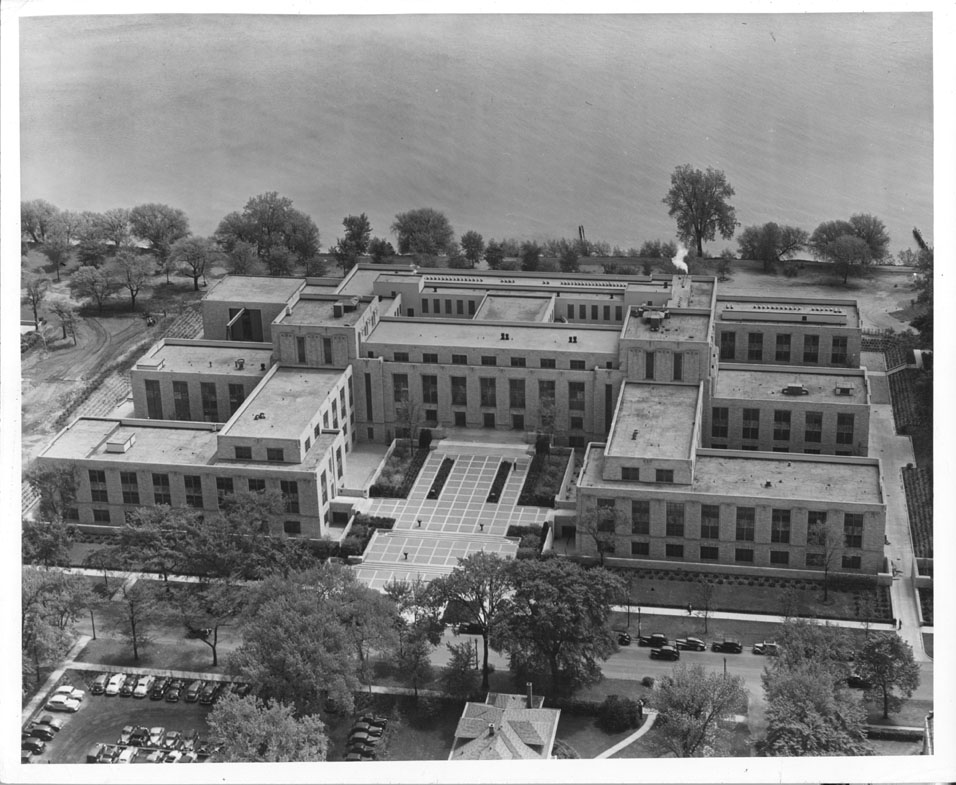
Technological Institute in 1942, before the construction of the Lakefill

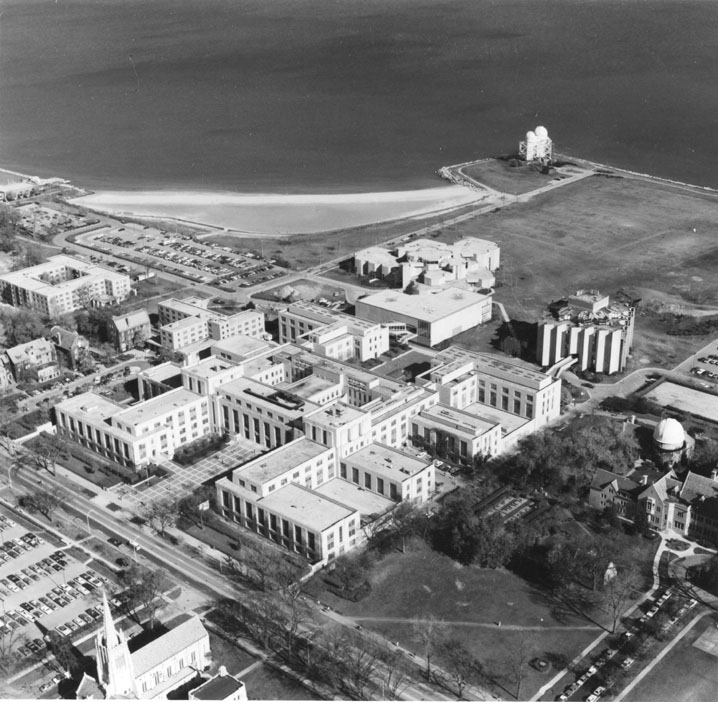
Technological Institute in 1977, after the construction of the Lakefill and two new wings on the eastern end of the building

The Northwestern Technological Institute (commonly known as "Tech") is a landmark building at Northwestern University. Built from 1940 to 1942, it is the main building for students and faculty in the Northwestern University School of Engineering. The School of Engineering itself was called the Northwestern Technological Institute before a major gift from the Robert R. McCormick Foundation gave it the present name in 1989.

== History ==
The construction of the building became possible after Walter Patton Murphy, a wealthy inventor of railroad equipment, donated $6.735 million on March 20, 1939. Murphy wanted the Institute to offer a new kind of “cooperative education” model for engineering, with academic courses and practical application in industrial settings closely integrated.

== Construction ==
To make room for the new building, the Phi Kappa Psi fraternity house and the Dearborn Observatory were moved, and the original Patten Gymnasium was demolished. Ground was broken for the new building on April 1, 1940 and the building was dedicated on June 15–16, 1942. The building was designed by the architectural firm of Holabird & Root in the shape of two letter E's, placed back to back and joined by a central structure. Each of the six departments at the time occupied one wing. When it was built it was the largest building on Northwestern's Evanston campus. After the construction of Tech was completed in December 1942, Northwestern received an additional bequest of $28 million from Murphy's estate to provide for an engineering school "second to none".

== New wings and neighboring buildings ==
In 1961, construction began on two new wings, which were added to the eastern ends of the building, along with additions to the library and physics wing. The expansion, dedicated in October, 1963, was prompted by a $3.4 million contract awarded by the Advanced Research Agency of the Department of Defense. In 1973, a new entrance terrace was dedicated. By the end of the 1980s, the building was again in need of repair. After a $30 million grant from the McCormick Foundation in 1989, the school was renamed in honor of Robert R. McCormick.

In 1999, a ten-year, $125 million renovation of the Technological institute was completed. This renovation, undertaken by Skidmore, Owings & Merrill, included extensive reconstruction of the interior of the original 1940 structure, replacing the mechanical, plumbing, and electrical systems, and reconfiguring the laboratory and research space.

Additional buildings have been constructed around the original Technological Institute, connected together by pedestrian bridges to create what has been called the "Technological Campus". Among them are the Seeley G. Mudd Library for Science and Engineering opened in 1977, the Center for Catalysis and Surface Science in 1986, and Cook Hall in 1989. More recent additions to the "Technological Campus" include Hogan Hall, the Pancoe Life Sciences Pavilion, the Center for Nanofabrication, and the Ford Motor Company Engineering Design Center.
