= Cecil Jensen =

American cartoonist

Cecil Jensen (January 17, 1902 - May 1976) was an American editorial cartoonist.

Born in Ogden, Utah, Jensen studied at the Chicago Academy of Fine Arts. After moving to California, Jensen worked at the Los Angeles Illustrated Daily News, eventually as editorial cartoonist.

== Editorial cartoons ==
In 1928, Jensen returned to Chicago, where he was the editorial cartoonist at the Chicago Daily News.

== Comic strips ==
During World War II, Jensen caricatured Chicago Tribune publisher Colonel McCormick as "Colonel McCosmic". In 1946, he started the comic strip Syncopating Sue, and he also drew Elmo and Debbie. In 1949, the Register and Tribune Syndicate renamed the strip Little Debbie, shifting focus from character Elmo to his little sister Debbie. Little Debbie became its more popular title, and it ran until 1961. Editor & Publisher noted in 1949:

Jensen operates from a studio in the Chicago Daily News, for whom he did editorial cartoons since 1928 before beginning the comic strip. Publisher John Knight of the News was persuaded to let him go to comic strip creation only on the promise that he would continue with one editorial cartoon, weekly.

== Awards ==
Sigma Delta Chi Awarded Jensen for his work in 1953.
