= Cissy Patterson =

American novelist

Eleanor, Countess Gizycki
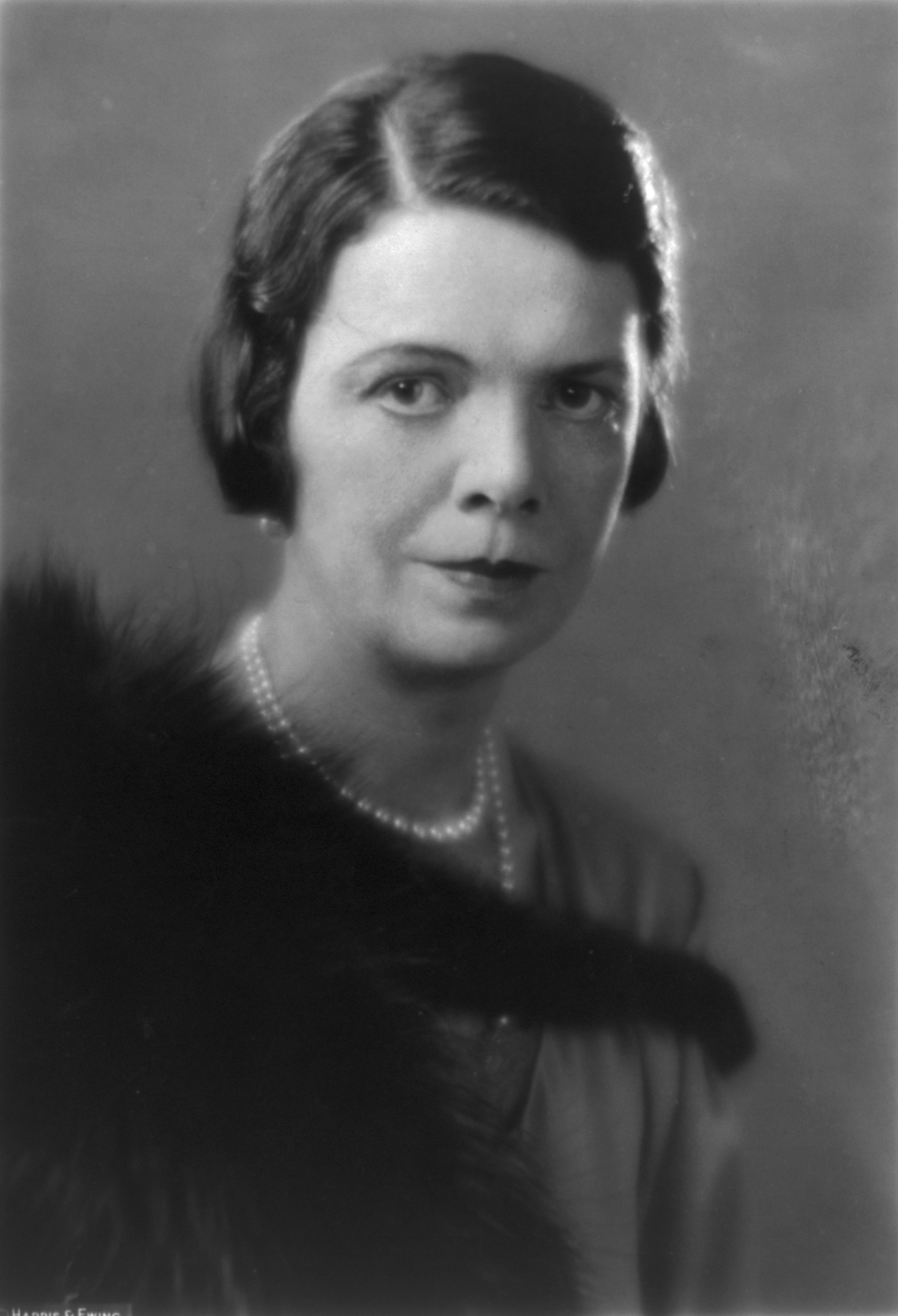
- Eleanor "Cissy" Patterson
- Born: Elinor Josephine Patterson; November 7, 1881; Chicago, Illinois
- Died: July 24, 1948 (aged 66); Mount Airy, Rosaryville, Maryland
- Education: Miss Porter's School
- Spouse: Count Josef Gizycki (m. 1904, divorced)
- Children: Felicia Leonora Gizycki
- Parent(s): Robert Wilson Patterson; Elinor Medill Patterson
- Relatives: Joseph Medill Patterson (brother); Joseph Medill (grandfather)

Eleanor Josephine Medill "Cissy" Patterson, Countess Gizycki (November 7, 1881 – July 24, 1948) was an American journalist and newspaper editor, publisher and owner. She was one of the first women to head a major daily newspaper, the Washington Times-Herald in Washington, D.C.

== Early life ==
Elinor Josephine Patterson was born in Chicago, Illinois, on November 7, 1881, (Note: Patterson would later claim she was born in 1884 to hide her actual age. She would also later add "Medill" to her name.) to the daughter of Robert and Elinor "Nellie" (née Medill) Patterson. She changed the spelling of her first name to "Eleanor" as an adult, but was mostly known as "Cissy". Her grandfather, Joseph Medill, was mayor of Chicago and owned the Chicago Tribune, which later passed into the hands of another Medill grandchild, her first cousin Colonel Robert R. McCormick. Cissy's older brother, who for a time was also involved in the Tribune, Joseph Medill Patterson, was the founder of the New York Daily News.

== Education and marriage ==
She was educated at Miss Porter's School in Farmington, Connecticut, graduating in 1901. When her uncle Robert S. McCormick was named ambassador to Austria-Hungary, she accompanied him and his wife, Cissy's maternal aunt Kate, to Vienna. There, she met Count Josef Gizycki and fell in love with him, a romance not interrupted even by her return to America, where she lived in Washington, D.C. In Washington, she was a leading light in society, where the press labeled Alice Roosevelt (daughter of Theodore), Marguerite Cassini (daughter of Arthur Cassini, the Russian ambassador to the U.S. and mother of Oleg Cassini), and Cissy the "Three Graces." Count Gizycki came to America, and they were married in Washington, D.C. on April 14, 1904, despite her family's objections.

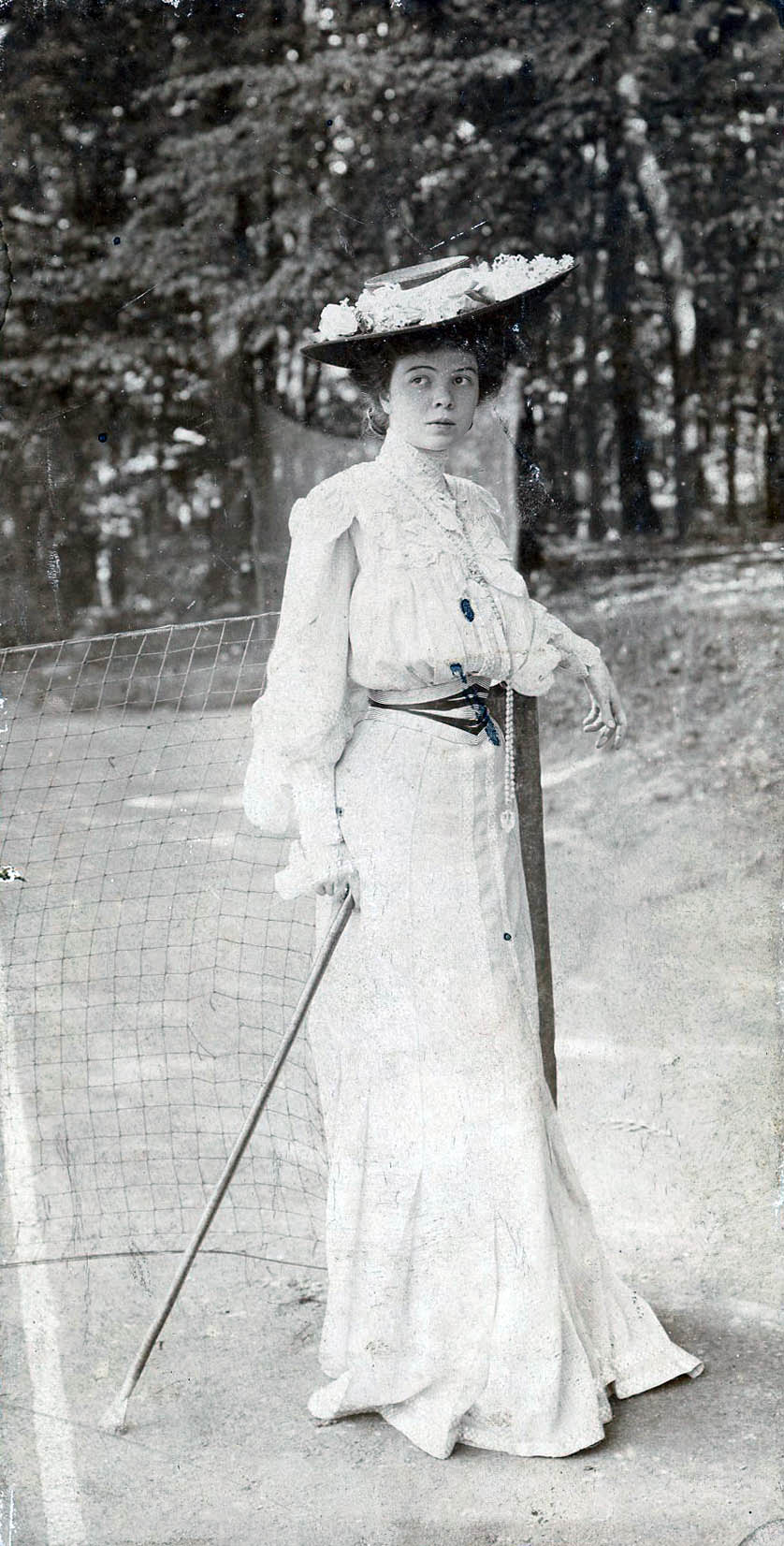
Cissy Patterson, 1904

A daughter was born to them on September 3, 1905, and was named Felicia Leonora (1905–1999). Cissy went with the Count to his home, a vast feudal manor in Russian Poland. Their family life did not go well. They separated and rejoined several times, but Cissy eventually set herself on leaving. She took their child, hiding her in a house near London, but the Count pursued her and kidnapped their daughter, hiding her in an Austrian convent. Cissy filed for divorce, which took thirteen years to obtain.

== Business dealings and social life ==
After her experience abroad, she moved to Lake Forest, Illinois, a Chicago suburb, but she returned to Washington in 1913. In 1920, her brother Joseph finally succumbed to his sister's pleas and allowed her to write for his New York Daily News, founded the previous year. She also worked for William Randolph Hearst. She published two novels, romans à clef, Glass Houses (1926) and Fall Flight (1928), part of her feud with former friend Alice Roosevelt Longworth. In 1925, Eleanor married Elmer Schlesinger, a New York lawyer. He died four years later, and in 1930, Mrs. Schlesinger legally changed her name to Mrs. Eleanor Medill Patterson.

Patterson tried to buy Hearst's two Washington D.C. papers, the morning Washington Herald and the evening Washington Times. However, Hearst hated to sell anything, even when he needed the money. Although he had never made money from his Washington papers, he refused to give up the prestige of owning papers in the capital. However, Hearst agreed to make Patterson the papers' editor at the urging of his editor Arthur Brisbane.

"...And Cissy, although she had no education to speak of and she had very little journalistic experience, seemed to have some of that gift. One of the things she did when William Randolph Hearst allowed her to run his Washington Herald, which was running fifth in a six-paper market in 1930, she immediately started making changes, the kind of changes that her brother would have made. She added a lot of local features, a lot of local color. She hired a lot of local writers, rather than use the, as she put it, “canned stuff” that came off the Hearst wires." - Amanda Smith, 2011

"She revitalized the paper and promptly changed the Times from a staid and plodding publication to one more vitally interested in the most tawdry murders to women’s issues and society columns. The addition of coverage of much of Washington’s glittering society appealed to women readers, as did articles on food and fashion. Cissy hired several women to write for the Times and her changes had the effect of propelling the Washington Herald to one of the leading newspapers in Washington, D. C. It wasn’t long before Cissy Patterson had doubled the circulation of the Herald, a feat William Randolph Hearst himself had not been able to accomplish." - Ray Hill, The Knoxville Focus

She began work on August 1, 1930. Patterson was a hands-on editor who insisted on the best of everything—writing, layout, typography, images, and comics. She encouraged society reporting and the women's page and hired many women as reporters, including Adela Rogers St. Johns and Martha Blair. In 1936, she was invited to join the American Society of Newspaper Editors.

In April 1931, Patterson purchased Mount Airy, a mansion built by Charles Calvert, 3rd Baron Baltimore in the 1600s. Located on extensive grounds near Rosaryville, Maryland, since about 1910 the mansion's owners had operated it as Dower House, an exclusive restaurant, but it suffered a severe fire in February 1931. Patterson not only meticulously restored the mansion, but improved the stables, added a guest house, and built a greenhouse for growing orchids.

In 1937, Hearst's finances had worsened, and he agreed to lease the Herald and the Times to Patterson with an option to buy. Eugene Meyer, the man who had outbid Hearst and Patterson for The Washington Post in 1933, tried to buy the Herald out from under Patterson, but failed. Instead, she bought both papers from Hearst on January 28, 1939, and merged them as the Times-Herald.

"Henry Luce, husband of Clare Booth Luce, sometime playwright and Congresswoman, was the owner of the august TIME magazine and LIFE, among other publications. His dislike for Cissy was likely in part for Cissy’s tart dismissal of his wife as “that lovely asp” and he derided Cissy’s newspaper as “Cissy’s henhouse.” Cissy did indeed use her newspaper to punish her enemies as well as publicly pick at issues sure to appeal to her readers." - Ray Hill, The Knoxville Focus

During the 1930s, Patterson was generally supportive of Roosevelt and the New Deal. Her friendship with Eleanor Roosevelt was particularly close. Although her Times-Herald, along with brother Joseph Medill Patterson's New York Daily News, endorsed the president for a third term in 1940, both turned against his foreign policy by early 1941. They feared that he was needlessly drawing the U.S. into a foreign war. After the attack on Pearl Harbor, however, both Cissy and Joe immediately offered their full support to the war effort but the president, rebuffed them, warning that Cissy needed to "behave herself." "Roosevelt could easily have converted both Pattersons to his cause," writes Cissy's biographer, Ralph G. Martin. "Instead, he created two bitter and powerful enemies." Furthermore, Roosevelt urged Attorney General Francis Biddle and other officials to intensify investigations against the so-called "McCormick-Patterson Axis."

In 1942, after the Battle of Midway, the Times-Herald ran a Tribune story that the U.S. had advance knowledge about the movements of the Japanese attack force. The story did not report that the U.S. had broken the Japanese naval code, but that was a natural conclusion the enemy could make from the content. Roosevelt, furious, had the Tribune and the Times-Herald indicted for espionage but backed down because of the publicity, charges he was persecuting his enemies, and the likelihood of an acquittal (since the Navy's censors had twice cleared the story before it was published and the Code of Wartime Practices said nothing about the movement of enemy ships). Attorney General Biddle said that the government's humiliation in the case made him feel "like a fool."

During World War II, she and her brother were accused of being Nazi sympathizers even though both had endorsed the president in the previous three elections. Representative Elmer Holland of Pennsylvania said on the floor of the United States House of Representatives that the Pattersons "would welcome the victory of Hitler."

According to a file from the Federal Bureau of Investigation, she was also involved in a case involving an affair she had with a member of MacArthur’s staff, or perhaps even MacArthur himself, in 1944.

== Family difficulties ==
She feuded with her daughter Felicia, who publicly "divorced" her in 1945, and with her former son-in-law, Drew Pearson, by whom she had a granddaughter, Ellen Cameron Pearson Arnold (1926–2010). An alcoholic for most of her adult life, she died of a heart attack at age 66 at Mount Airy. She left the paper to seven of her editors, who sold it to her cousin Colonel McCormick within the year. He held onto the paper for five years, and although he seemed close to returning it to profitability for several years, it eventually proved too significant a financial drain. After sounding out several other publishers quietly, McCormick opted to sell the paper to the rival Post, which promptly closed it.

As Countess Gizycki, Patterson was a frequent visitor to her ranch in Jackson Hole, Wyoming, in the 1920s, where Donald Hough records an unexpected aspect of her personality: the ability to speak effectively to horses in language worthy of a native cowboy. The Flat Creek Ranch is now on the National Register of Historic Places.

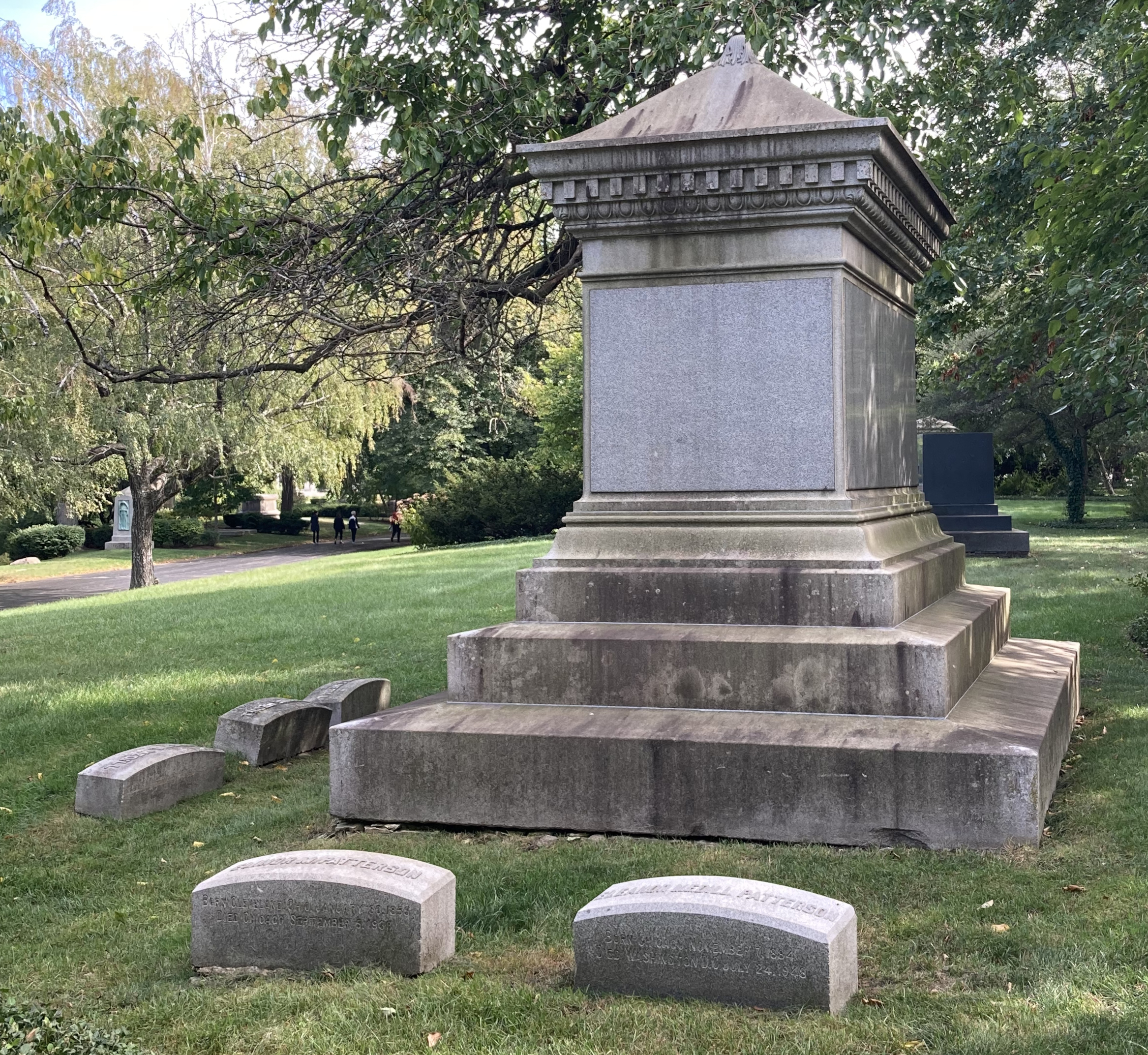
Patterson's grave

== Family tree ==
Medill Chicago family tree

Joseph Medill (1823–1899)	Katherine Patrick
Robert Wilson Patterson (1850–1910)	Elinor Medill (1855–1933)	Katherine van Etta Medill (1853–1932)	Robert Sanderson McCormick (1849–1919)
Joseph Medill Patterson (1879–1946)	Eleanor Josephine Medill Patterson (1884–1948)	Ruth Hanna (1880–1944)	Joseph Medill McCormick (1877–1925)	Robert Rutherford McCormick (1880–1955)
Alicia Patterson (1906–1963)	Harry Frank Guggenheim (1890–1971)	Jay Frederick Reeve (1893–1956)	Josephine Medill Patterson (1913–1996)	Ivan Le Lorraine Albright (1897–1983)	James Joseph Patterson (1923–1992)
Madeleine Jana Korbel (1937–2022)	Joseph Medill Patterson Reeve, later Albright (born 1937)	Alice Reeve, later Albright (1940–2016)	Michael J. Arlen (born 1930)

== Bibliography ==
- Beito, David T. (2023). The New Deal's War on the Bill of Rights: The Untold Story of FDR's Concentration Camps, Censorship, and Mass Surveillance (First ed.). Oakland: Independent Institute. pp. 4–7. ISBN 978-1598133561.
- Healy, Paul F. (1966). Cissy: The Biography of Eleanor M. 'Cissy' Patterson. New York: Doubleday.
- Hoge, Alice Albright (1966). Cissy Patterson. New York: Random House.
- MacHenry, Robert (1983). Famous American Women. New York: Dover Publishing. ISBN 9780486245232.
- Martin, Ralph G. (1979). Cissy: The Extraordinary Life of Eleanor Medill Patterson. New York: Simon & Schuster. ISBN 9780671225575.
- Smith, Amanda (2011). Newspaper Titan: The Infamous Life and Monumental Times of Cissy Patterson. New York: Alfred A. Knopf. ISBN 9780375411007.
