= McCormick Foundation =

Chicago-based nonprofit charitable trust established in 1955

McCormick Foundation is a Chicago-based nonprofit charitable trust established in 1955, following the death of "Colonel" Robert R. McCormick of the McCormick family. As of 2010, it had more than US$1 billion in assets.

== History ==
In 1911, McCormick became the editor and publisher of the Chicago Tribune, a position he held until his death in 1955. McCormick's will founded a charitable trust to promote his beliefs regarding the First Amendment, citizenship, community service, education and journalism.

In May 2008, the foundation’s Board of Directors changed its name from McCormick Tribune Foundation to the McCormick Foundation to clarify that the Foundation no longer held an ownership position in the Tribune Company. In May 2009, the foundation appointed Chicago native, lawyer and former CEO of the Los Angeles Times, David Hiller as its president and CEO. Hiller succeeded David L. Grange, a retired United States Army major general, who was the foundation’s president from 2005–2009.

== Parks and museums ==
=== Cantigny Park ===
McCormick left his grandfather Joseph Medill's estate, that he called Cantigny, as a public park. The park is located in Wheaton, Illinois.

=== Mobilization of the McCormick Freedom Museum ===
From April 2006 to March 2009 the foundation funded the McCormick Tribune Freedom Museum which focused on First Amendment rights: freedom of speech, religion, press, assembly and petition. In January 2009, the foundation announced it was turning the McCormick Freedom Museum mobile. The mobile museum made its debut in Chicago’s Pioneer Court on May 27, 2010.

== Grantmaking ==
The foundation has six programs:

=== Education ===
After a $30 million grant to renovate the Technological Institute in 1989, the Engineering school of Northwestern University was renamed the Robert R. McCormick School of Engineering and Applied Science. Since 2003, the foundation focused on programs for children up to the age of eight in Illinois, including Advance Illinois, Illinois Action for Children, Ounce of Prevention Fund, and the Erikson Institute.

=== Journalism ===
The foundation makes grants concerning journalism, including American Society of Newspaper Editors Foundation, Radio Arte, News Literacy Project, Northwestern University's Media Management Center, and the Poynter Institute.

=== Civics ===
The foundation makes grants to improve access to civic education and engagement opportunities for Chicago area youth ages 12–22, including Mikva Challenge, City Year Chicago, Interfaith Youth Core, Illinois Campus Compact, and Constitutional Rights Foundation Chicago.

=== Communities ===
The foundation partners with media outlets and sports teams (including the Cleveland Cavaliers, Orlando Magic, Chicago Blackhawks, Chicago Cubs and the Chicago White Sox) to raise money for local needs, often granting matching funds.

=== Veterans ===
In 2008 and 2009 the foundation made grants for services for returning veterans from Operation Enduring Freedom and Operation Iraqi Freedom.

=== Other initiatives ===
The foundation makes grants for Chicago healthcare, cultural, education and human service organizations. Examples include Chicago Lighthouse for the blind or visually impaired, Children's Memorial Hospital, and Off The Street Club.
