= Cantigny Golf Club =

Public golf course in Wheaton, Illinois, US

Cantigny Golf
- Interactive map of Cantigny Golf
- 41.847°N 88.155°W

Club information
- Location: 27w270 Mack Road; Wheaton; Illinois; United States
- Established: 1989
- Type: Public
- Operator: Kemper Sports
- Tota holes: 27

Cantigny Golf Club is a public golf course located in Wheaton, Illinois. It is a 27-hole course owned by the Robert R. McCormick Foundation and managed by Kemper Sports.

== History ==
Cantigny Golf is built on the former estate of Colonel Robert R. McCormick, who was the editor and publisher of the Chicago Tribune. Robert R. McCormick inherited the land, which was known then as Red Oaks Farm, from his mother. The renaming of the land to Cantigny came upon Colonel McCormick's return from duty in World War I, where he led the First Infantry Division into the first American Victory in World War I at the Battle at Cantigny, a small French village roughly 60 miles north of Paris.

Upon Robert R. McCormicks passing, and due to his lack of kin, his will instructed that his entire estate to be used for philanthropic purposes, and the land to be used as a place of recreation for the public.

To encourage the public's use of the land, the McCormick Foundation developed plans for a public golf course. The construction of Cantigny Golf began in 1986, by the Wadsworth Construction Company, and was completed in 1988, and opened to the public in 1989. The course, designed by Roger Packard, is composed of three 9-hole courses: Lakeside, Woodside, and Hillside. Jacobson Golf Course Design updated the course in 2003.

== Tournaments ==
Important Tournaments hosted by Cantigny Golf:

- 1998 – Illinois PGA Club Professional Championship
- 2002 – Illinois State Amateur Championship
- 2007 – U.S. Amateur Public Links Championship
- 2013 and 2014 – Chicago Open
