= Robert R. McCormick =

American lawyer, Army officer, and newspaperman (1880–1955)

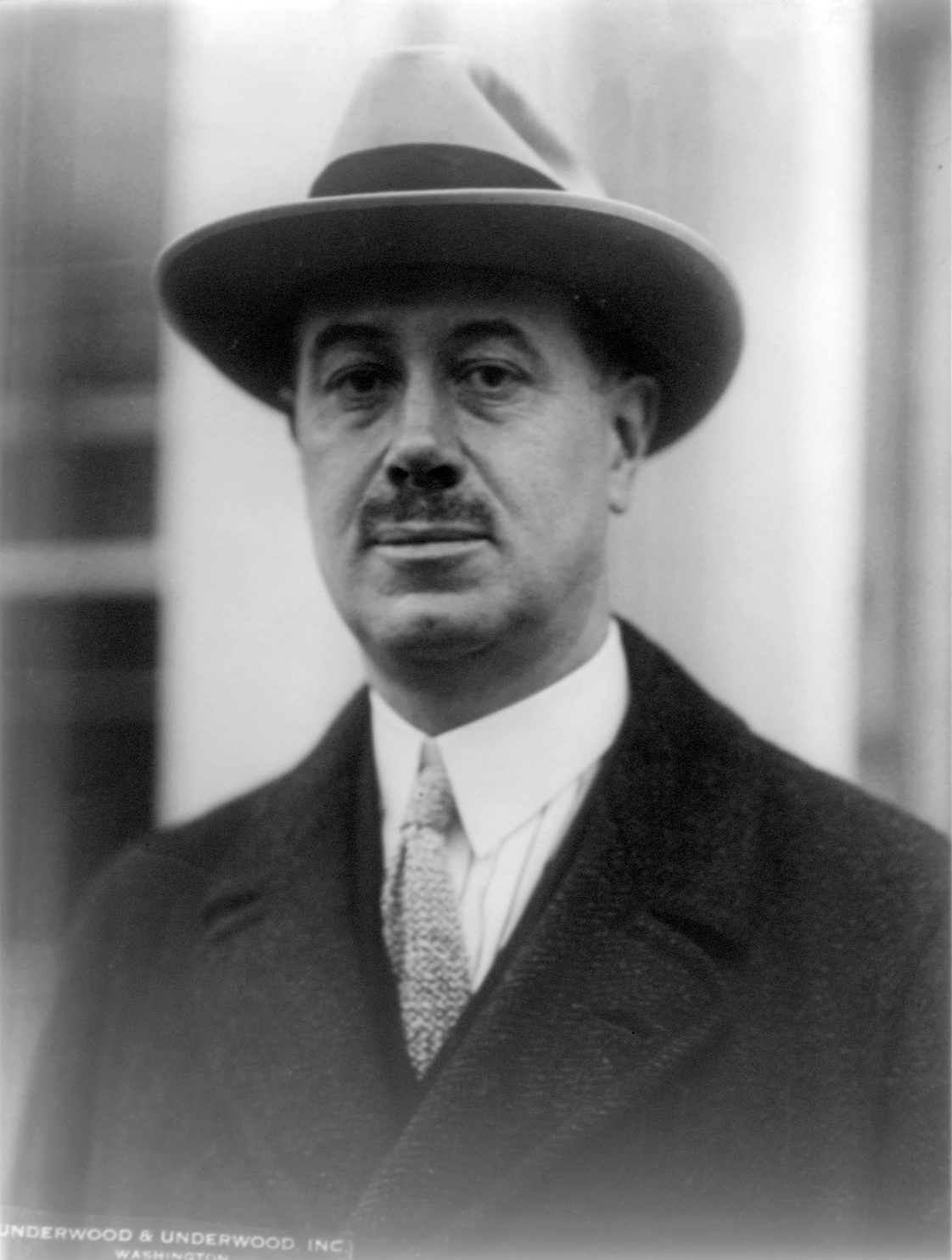
- McCormick in 1925
- Born: Robert Rutherford McCormick; July 30, 1880; Chicago, Illinois, U.S.
- Died: April 1, 1955 (aged 74); Wheaton, Illinois, U.S.
- Education: Yale University (BA); Northwestern University (LLB)
- Political party: Republican
- Movement: Non-interventionism
- Spouses: Amie Irwin Adams (m. 1915; died 1939) Maryland Mathison Hooper (m. 1944)
- Parent(s): Robert Sanderson McCormick; Katherine Van Etta Medill
- Relatives: McCormick family

Robert Rutherford "Colonel" McCormick (July 30, 1880 – April 1, 1955) was an American publisher, lawyer, and businessman. A member of the McCormick family of Chicago, McCormick became a lawyer, Republican Chicago alderman, distinguished U.S. Army officer in World War I, and eventually owner and publisher of the Chicago Tribune newspaper. A leading Republican, McCormick opposed the New Deal and later opposed American entry into World War II. His legacy includes what is now the McCormick Foundation philanthropic organization.

== Early life and international education ==
McCormick was born July 30, 1880, in Chicago to Robert Sanderson McCormick (1849–1919) and his wife, Katherine Van Etta Medill McCormick (1853–1932). Family members quickly nicknamed him "Bertie" because so many relatives shared the name, including his late patrilineal great-grandfather Robert McCormick. His maternal grandfather was Tribune editor and former Chicago mayor Joseph Medill, on whose estate McCormick would live for much of his adult life.

On his father's side, his great-uncle was inventor and businessman Cyrus McCormick. His elder brother Joseph Medill McCormick (known by his middle name) was slated to take over the family newspaper business, but was more interested in running for political office, and became a member of the United States House of Representatives (1917–1919) and then the U.S. Senate before losing his bid for a second term and committing suicide in Washington, D.C. in 1925. Meanwhile, from 1889 through 1893, Bertie lived a lonely childhood with his parents in London. His father Robert Sanderson McCormick was Second Secretary of the American Legation in London, serving from 1889 to 1892 under Robert Todd Lincoln. Later, his father served as his nation's ambassador to Austria-Hungary (1901–1902) and Imperial Russia (1902–1905), and replaced Horace Porter as ambassador to France in 1905.

While in London, Bertie attended Ludgrove School. Sent back to the United States, Bertie attended Groton School, as had his brother. In 1899, the year of his maternal grandfather Joseph Medill's death, McCormick matriculated at Yale College, where he was elected to the prestigious secret society Scroll and Key and graduated in 1903 (three years after his brother). Robert McCormick then attended the Northwestern University School of Law and after graduation became a clerk in a Chicago law firm.

== Career ==
Robert McCormick was admitted to the Illinois bar in 1907. The following year, he co-founded the law firm that became Kirkland & Ellis, which represented the Tribune Company. However, his elder brother, Medill McCormick, had become depressed after taking over and expanding the family newspaper business, so, in 1908, on the advice of psychoanalyst Carl Jung, Medill gave up that job, and Robert became increasingly involved in the family publishing business. Despite that business involvement, a scandal that ultimately led to his marriage (see below), and his military service (which led to him becoming known as "the Colonel"), McCormick continued as a law firm partner until 1920.

In 1910, Robert McCormick took control of the Chicago Tribune and, in 1914, became editor and publisher with his cousin, Captain Joseph Medill Patterson, who was the son of a Tribune editor who had wed Joseph Medill's daughter. In 1919, Patterson, a former U.S. Representative from Illinois, moved to New York City and founded the tabloid New York Daily News. However he and McCormick, while often disagreeing, jointly held both positions at the Chicago Tribune until 1926, when McCormick assumed both roles at the Tribune, and Patterson concentrated on the New York Daily News.

In 1904, a Republican ward leader persuaded McCormick to run for alderman. Elected, he served two years on the Chicago City Council. In 1905, at the age of 25, he was elected to a five-year term as president of the board of trustees of the Chicago Sanitary District, which operated the city's vast drainage and sewage disposal system. In 1907 McCormick was appointed to the Chicago Permanent Charter Commission and the Chicago Plan Commission. However, his political career ended abruptly when he took control of the Tribune.

McCormick went to Europe as a war correspondent for the Tribune in February 1915, early in World War I. He interviewed Tsar Nicholas, Prime Minister H. H. Asquith, and First Lord of the Admiralty Winston Churchill. McCormick also visited (and was under fire on) both the Eastern and Western Fronts. Using connections his father had made while ambassador to Russia, McCormick attended formal dinners with Grand Duke Nicholas and Grand Duke Peter. During this trip, McCormick collected fragments of the cathedral at Ypres and the city hall of Arras. Reputedly, these pieces were the first of the collection of stones that were later embedded in the facade of the Tribune Tower. However, they are not actually on display.

=== Military service ===
Returning to the United States in early 1915, McCormick joined the Illinois National Guard on June 21, 1916. His family background, education and expert horsemanship led to his being commissioned as a major in its 1st Cavalry Regiment. Two days earlier, President Woodrow Wilson had called the Illinois National Guard into federal service, along with those of several other states, to patrol the Mexican border during General John Joseph Pershing's Punitive Expedition. McCormick accompanied his regiment to the Mexican border. Soon after, the United States entered the war, the entire Illinois National Guard was mobilized for federal service in Europe. McCormick thus became part of the U.S. Army on June 13, 1917, and was sent to France as an intelligence officer on the staff of General Pershing. Seeking more active service, he was assigned to an artillery school.

By June 17, 1918, McCormick became a lieutenant colonel, and by September 5, 1918, was promoted to a full colonel in the field artillery. He took part in the capture of Cantigny (hence his later naming his farm estate near Wheaton, Illinois), and in the battles of Soissons, Saint-Mihiel, and the second phase of the Argonne. McCormick served in the 1st Battalion, 5th Field Artillery Regiment, with the 1st Infantry Division. His service ended on December 31, 1918, though he remained a part of the Officers Reserve Corps from October 8, 1919, to September 30, 1929. Cited for prompt action in battle, he received the Distinguished Service Medal, and was later always referred to as "Colonel McCormick".

=== Crusading publisher ===
McCormick returned from the war and took control of the Tribune in the 1920s. Given the lack of schools of journalism in the midwestern United States at the time, McCormick and Patterson sponsored a school named for their grandfather, the Joseph Medill School of Journalism. It was announced by Walter Dill Scott in November 1920, and began classes in 1921.

As publisher of the Tribune, McCormick was involved in a number of legal disputes regarding freedom of the press that were handled by McCormick's longtime lawyer Weymouth Kirkland. The most famous of these cases is Near v. Minnesota, 283 U.S. 697 (1931), a case championed by McCormick in his role as chairman of the American Newspaper Publishers Association's Committee on Free Speech.

In 1919, automobile magnate Henry Ford sued the Chicago Tribune and Robert McCormick for libel after the Tribune called him an “anarchist” in an editorial. The Tribune’s writer used the term in response to Ford’s opposition to President Woodrow Wilson sending military forces to the Mexican border in 1916 and Ford calling soldiers “murderers.” The trial lasted over the summer of 1919 and several prominent witnesses including generals were called to testify. So too were three history professors, Columbia University’s William Archibald Dunning, Ohio State University’s Francis Coker (who earned his Ph.D under Dunning), and University of Michigan’s Jesse Siddall Reeves. As expert witnesses, the three provided differing definitions of anarchism which, unlike Marxism, had no philosophical “father.” In the end Ford prevailed on the question of whether he was libeled but the jury only awarded him six cents and he asked for $1million.

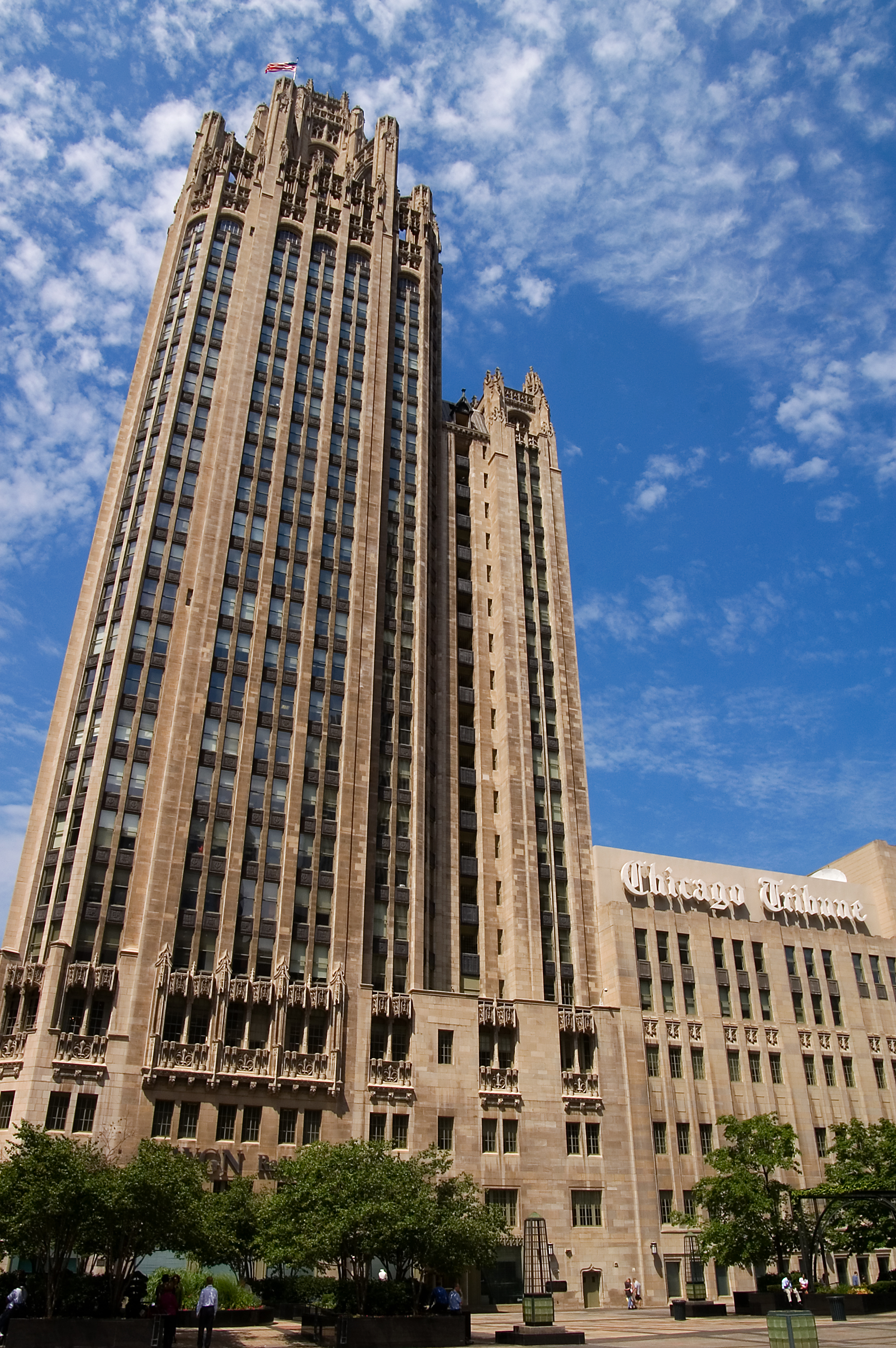
Tribune Tower

A conservative Republican, McCormick was an opponent of President Franklin D. Roosevelt and compared the New Deal to Communism. For a period in 1935, he protested Rhode Island's Democratic judiciary by displaying a 47-star flag outside the Tribune building, with the 13th star (representing Rhode Island) removed; he relented after he was advised that alteration of the American flag was unlawful.

He was also an America First non-interventionist who strongly opposed entering World War II "to rescue the British Empire". He famously published the "Victory Program," a military plan that FDR had ordered in the summer of 1941 to prepare the United States for possible entry into World War II. It had been leaked to him by US Senator Burton K. Wheeler. The publication was on December 4, 1941, only three days before the Japanese attack on Pearl Harbor. The controversy it stirred died off quickly after the December 7 attack. In June 1942, the Tribune published an article that indicated that the Americans had broken Japanese codes, the 1942 Chicago Tribune incident.

As a publisher he was very innovative. McCormick was a 25 percent owner of the Tribune's 50,000 watt radio station, which was purchased in 1924; he named it WGN, the initials of the Tribune's motto, the "World's Greatest Newspaper". He also established the town of Baie-Comeau, Quebec in 1936 and constructed a paper mill and a hydroelectric power plant there named McCormick Dam to generate electricity for the mill.

McCormick carried on crusades against various local, state, and national politicians, gangsters and racketeers, labor unions, prohibition and prohibitionists, Wall Street, the East and Easterners, Democrats, the New Deal and the Fair Deal, liberal Republicans, the League of Nations, the World Court, the United Nations, British imperialism, socialism, and communism. Besides Roosevelt, his chief targets included Chicago Mayor William Hale Thompson and Illinois Governor Len Small.

Some of McCormick's personal crusades were seen as quixotic (such as his attempts to reform spelling of the English language) and were parodied in political cartoons in rival Frank Knox's Chicago Daily News. Knox's political cartoonists, including Cecil Jensen, derided McCormick as "Colonel McCosmic", a "pompous, paunchy, didactic individual with a bristling mustache and superlative ego."

In 1943, he told an audience he helped plan a defence against an invasion from Canada at the end of World War I. In June 1947, he gave a 100-year birthday party for the Tribune that included a fireworks show called "the most colossal show since the Chicago fire." Other publications noted that everything about the celebration was called "the world's greatest". Time magazine editorialized that "the Tribune has been made into a worldwide symbol of reaction, isolation, and prejudice by a man capable of real hate."

McCormick had purchased the Washington Times-Herald newspaper following the 1948 death of Eleanor Medill "Cissy" Patterson, his first cousin. The paper was an "isolationist and archconservative" publication known for sensationalism.

McCormick appointed his niece, then known as Ruth "Bazy" McCormick Miller as the publisher of the paper in 1949. He wanted Bazy to use the paper to create "an outpost of American principles". When the two came to a parting of the ways over her relationship with one of the paper's editors, Garvin Tankersley, as well as editorial control over the paper, he ordered her to choose between Tankersley and the Tribune Company. As a result, she resigned from the Times-Herald. Bazy later said, "I understood when I went to the Times-Herald I was to have full control. That control was not given me ... There is some difference in our political beliefs. I have broader Republican views than [McCormick] has. I am for the same people as the colonel, but I am for some more people.

McCormick tried to run the paper himself, but lost money on the venture, and sold the Times-Herald to The Washington Post in 1954. When he announced the sale, one of the paper's board members insisted that Bazy be given a chance to purchase it, so McCormick gave her 48 hours to match the $10 million asking price. She could not raise the money to do so. Upon the purchase of the Times-Herald, the Post consolidated its market position by discontinuing the rival paper. In 1955 he cofounded the American Security Council, an anti-communist organization.

=== Family life and scandal ===
McCormick married twice, and had no children from either marriage. His first wife was Amie de Houle "Amy" Irwin (born 1872), the former wife of his father's first cousin, Edward Shields Adams. Starting in the summer of 1904, McCormick had spent much time at the homes of Adams in downtown Chicago and Lake Forest, Illinois. Her father was decorated soldier Bernard J. D. Irwin.

Starting in November 1913, a bitter family dispute developed. Amy Irwin Adams filed for divorce, claiming Adams was alcoholic, and the suit was granted on March 6, 1914, without her husband appearing in court. In September 1914, Adams filed another lawsuit. He sued McCormick for trespass and asked for the divorce case to be heard again. The opposition press made the most out of the scandals. Adams presented McCormick with a bill for eight years of lodging, and claimed McCormick had "wickedly and maliciously debauched and carnally knew the said Amy Irwin Adams" while his guest. Other allegations included that McCormick had a former chauffeur arrested and interrogated by a private detective. McCormick then counterclaimed that he had made loans to Adams which had to be repaid. The case was heard by Federal Court Judge Kenesaw Mountain Landis in November. It was hinted that McCormick had promised to forgive the loans if Adams dropped his suit to reopen the divorce. Landis ruled in favor of McCormick in February 1915.

Following the settlement, on March 10, 1915, McCormick married Amy Irwin Adams, after waiting the year after the original divorce decree as was required by law at the time. The wedding occurred in London, in the registry office of St George's, Hanover Square, with only two witnesses present. The Tribune did not mention the wedding, nor any of the previous lawsuits.

After Amy died in 1939, McCormick became a near social recluse. On December 21, 1944, he married Mrs. Maryland Mathison Hooper in the apartment of his cousin Chauncey McCormick. She was 47 and he was 64 at the time. She lived until July 21, 1985. In his later years and until his death, McCormick lived at the estate named Cantigny, in Wheaton, Illinois.

The childless McCormick for a time mentored his niece, Ruth (later Tankersley) to be the heir to his publishing empire. He was said to have "doted" on Bazy. When McCormick appointed her as the publisher of the Washington Times-Herald in 1949, she was 28 years old and was given the title of vice-president. When Bazy divorced her husband in 1951, ultimately to elope with an editor at the paper, Garvin "Tank" Tankersley, the two came to a parting of the ways. McCormick considered Tankersley to be of unsuitable social status for Bazy because "Tank" was from a poor Lynchburg, Virginia, family. McCormick also disapproved of her divorce in general, which Bazy viewed as hypocritical, given McCormick's own complicated personal life. When McCormick delivered the ultimatum that she choose between Garvin Tankersley and the paper, she resigned from the Times-Herald. Though estranged for many years, Bazy and McCormick reconciled prior to his death.

== Personality ==
McCormick was regarded as a "remote, coldly aloof, ruthless aristocrat, living in lonely magnificence, disdaining the common people ... an exceptional man, a lone wolf whose strength and courage could be looked up to, but at the same time had to be feared; an eccentric, misanthropic genius whose haughty bearing, cold eye and steely reserve made it impossible to like or trust him." McCormick was described by one opponent as "the greatest mind of the fourteenth century" and by the American labor historian Art Preis as a "fascist-minded multi-millionaire". In his memoirs, publisher Henry Regnery described his meeting with McCormick and William Henry Chamberlin:

The Colonel received us in his rather feudal office, high above Michigan Avenue at the top of his Gothic tower. He was a tall, erect, distinguished-looking man, who, with his white hair, blue eyes, ruddy complexion, white mustache, and in his manner and dress, conveyed the impression that he might have come from the English landed aristocracy. He was perfectly cordial, but gave us clearly to understand that our rather similar views on such matters as foreign policy and the administration in Washington were no basis for familiarity.

The New York Times wrote:

He did consider himself an aristocrat, and his imposing stature—6 feet 4 inches (193 cm) tall, with a muscular body weighing over 200 pounds (91 kg), his erect soldierly bearing, his reserved manner and his distinguished appearance—made it easy for him to play that role. But if he was one, he was an aristocrat, according to his friends, in the best sense of the word, despising the idle rich and having no use for parasites, dilettantes or mere pleasure-seekers, whose company, clubs and amusements he avoided. With an extraordinary capacity for hard work, he often put in seven long days a week at his job even when elderly, keeping fit through polo and later horseback riding. In his seventies, he could still get into the war uniform of his thirties.

== Death and legacy ==
In failing health since an attack of pneumonia, following a trip to Europe in April 1953; McCormick nonetheless remained active in his work until the month before he died, on April 1, 1955. He was buried on his farm, in his war uniform. His second wife survived him by three decades. Upon his death, the childless McCormick left an estate estimated at $55 million, including stock in the Chicago Tribune Company. His will established a trust devoted to charitable purposes, including maintenance of his former home, which became Cantigny and includes a house and war museum as well as formal gardens.

The Northwestern University School of Law building that opened in 1962 was named McCormick Hall following a donation from the foundation. After a donation to renovate the Technological Institute building at Northwestern University in 1989, the Robert R. McCormick School of Engineering and Applied Science was also named for him.

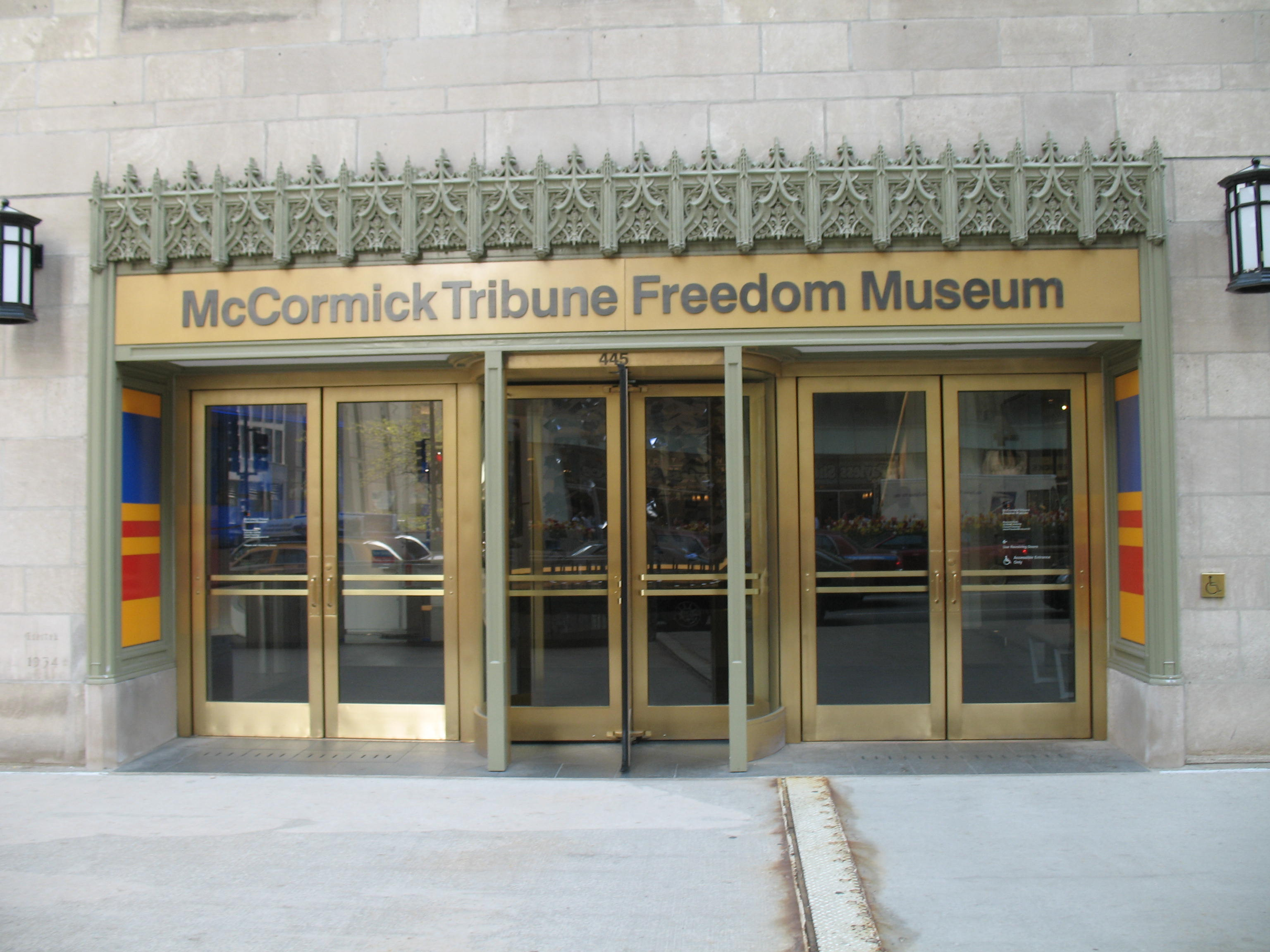
McCormick Tribune Freedom Museum was funded by the foundation

Within days of McCormick's death, Richard J. Daley was elected mayor and a new family would dominate Chicago, this time aligned with the Democratic Party for over half a century. Since McCormick had long advocated building a convention center, after it was built from 1957 to 1960 McCormick Place was named for him.

The trust eventually divested its ownership of the Tribune Company, so in 2008 changed its name from the McCormick Tribune Foundation to the Robert R. McCormick Foundation. It contributed more than a billion US dollars for journalism, early childhood education, civic health, social and economic services, arts and culture and citizenship.

McCormick endowed five scholarships at The Citadel, The Military College of South Carolina and deeded his Aiken, South Carolina estate to friend and former commander Charles Pelot Summerall with the stipulation that the General live there the remainder of his life. After Summerall's death in 1954, the estate was sold and the proceeds used to purchase a beach house in Isle of Palms, South Carolina, now known as the Robert R. McCormick Citadel Beach Club. The structure was destroyed by Hurricane Hugo in 1989 and subsequently rebuilt and hosts many functions including weddings and corporate events.

McCormick's legacy also extended to Canada, his grandfather Joseph Medill's birthplace. Six towns were created for the purpose of forestry and journal paper production: Heron Bay (Ont.), Gore Bay (Ont), Thorold (Ont.), Baie-Comeau (Que), Franquelin (Que) and Shelter Bay (Que), known as Port-Cartier today. Many monuments have been made in honor of the Colonel, in Baie-Comeau lay the biggest of them all, a bronze statue of the Colonel canoeing as he did in 1915 when he discovered the land that would welcome the town in 1937. The monument was made by Wheeler Williams an American sculptor. In 1955 the Quebec & Ontario Transportation Company renamed the cargo vessel the Manicouagan the Col. Robert R. McCormick.

== Family tree ==
=== Paternal side ===
McCormick Chicago family tree

Robert McCormick Jr. (1780–1846)	Mary Ann Hall (1780–1853)
Nancy Fowler (1835–1923)	Cyrus Hall McCormick Sr. (1809–1884)	William Sanderson McCormick (1815–1865)	Mary Ann Grigsby (1828–1878)	Leander James McCormick (1819–1900)
Cyrus Hall McCormick Jr. (1859–1936)	Anita McCormick Blaine (1866–1954)	Harold Fowler McCormick (1872–1941)	Robert Sanderson McCormick (1849–1919)	William Grigsby McCormick (1851–1941)	Anna Reubenia McCormick (1860–1917)	Leander Hamilton McCormick (1859–1934)
Joseph Medill McCormick (1877–1925)	Ruth Hanna (1880–1944)	Robert Rutherford McCormick (1880–1955)	Chauncey Brooks McCormick (1884–1954)	William McCormick Blair Sr. (1884–1982)
Bazy Tankersley (1921-2013)	Hope Baldwin (1919–1993)	Brooks McCormick (1917–2006)	William McCormick Blair Jr. (1916–2015)

Notes:

See Chaim M. Rosenberg, The International Harvester Company: A History of the Founding Families and Their Machines (McFarland, 2019). online

=== Maternal side ===
Medill Chicago family tree

Joseph Medill (1823–1899)	Katherine Patrick
Robert Wilson Patterson (1850–1910)	Elinor Medill (1855–1933)	Katherine van Etta Medill (1853–1932)	Robert Sanderson McCormick (1849–1919)
Joseph Medill Patterson (1879–1946)	Eleanor Josephine Medill Patterson (1884–1948)	Ruth Hanna (1880–1944)	Joseph Medill McCormick (1877–1925)	Robert Rutherford McCormick (1880–1955)
Alicia Patterson (1906–1963)	Harry Frank Guggenheim (1890–1971)	Jay Frederick Reeve (1893–1956)	Josephine Medill Patterson (1913–1996)	Ivan Le Lorraine Albright (1897–1983)	James Joseph Patterson (1923–1992)
Madeleine Jana Korbel (1937–2022)	Joseph Medill Patterson Reeve, later Albright (born 1937)	Alice Reeve, later Albright (1940–2016)	Michael J. Arlen (born 1930)
