= Shape-memory material =

A shape-memory material is a material that can be deformed and can return to its previous shape:

- Shape-memory alloys
- Shape-memory polymers
