= Rosaryville, Maryland =

Census-designated place in Maryland, US

- Census-designated place
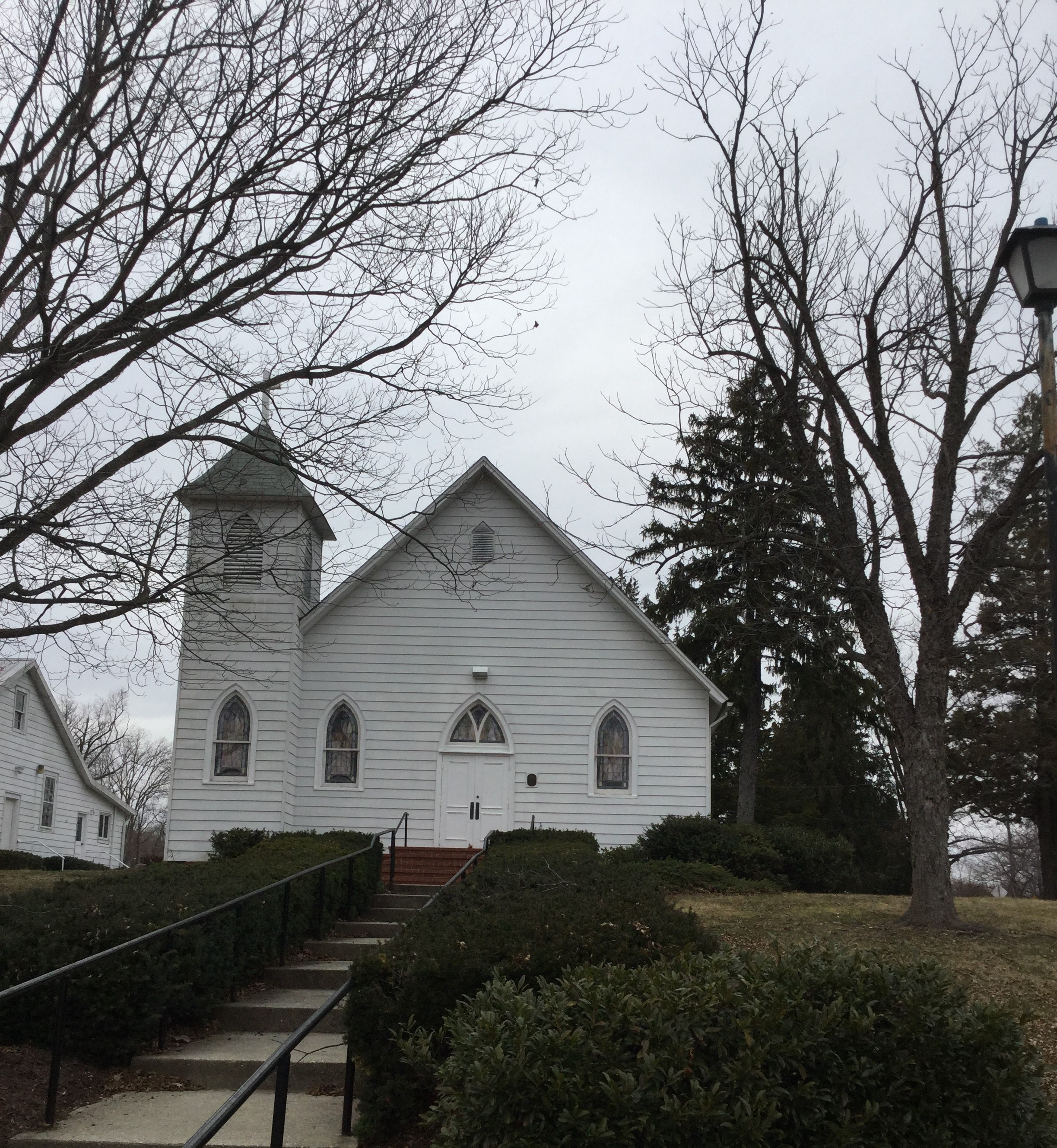
- Old Most Holy Rosary Church, Rosaryville, 2019

- Location of Rosaryville, Maryland
- Coordinates: 38°46′4″N 76°50′8″W
- Country: United States
- State: Maryland
- County: Prince George's

Area
  - Total: 9.20 sq mi (23.82 km^{2})
  - Land: 9.18 sq mi (23.78 km^{2})
  - Water: 0.015 sq mi (0.04 km^{2})
- Elevation: 223 ft (68 m)

Population (2020)
  - Total: 11,548
  - Density: 1,257.6/sq mi (485.55/km^{2})
- Time zone: UTC−5 (Eastern (EST))
  - Summer (DST): UTC−4 (EDT)
- Area codes: 301, 240
- FIPS code: 24-68300
- GNIS feature ID: 0597990

Rosaryville is an unincorporated area and census-designated place (CDP) in Prince George's County, Maryland, United States, located south of Clinton and Upper Marlboro beside U.S. Route 301. Per the 2020 census, the population was 11,548. including housing developments and rural open space. It was named for a local Catholic church. Close to Rosaryville are the Marlton housing development, Maryland Veterans Cemetery, the Southern Maryland Farmers Market, and Rosaryville State Park.

== History ==
His Lordship's Kindness was listed on the National Register of Historic Places and as a National Historic Landmark in 1970.

=== Famous people born in Rosaryville ===
George Washington Parke Custis was born in Rosaryville, Maryland on April 30, 1781. He was the son of Maryland-native, Eleanor Calvert Custis (later, Stuart) and Colonel John Parke Custis who was the son of Daniel Parke Custis and Martha Dandridge Custis (later, Washington).

== Geography ==
Rosaryville is located at 38°46′4″N 76°50′8″W (38.767664, −76.835568).

According to the United States Census Bureau, the CDP has a total area of 9.2 square miles (23.8 km^{2}), of which 0.02 square miles (0.04 km^{2}), or 0.18%, is water.

== Demographics ==
Historical population
Census	Pop.	Note	%±
1990	8,976		—
2000	12,322		37.3%
2010	10,697		−13.2%
2020	11,548		8.0%
U.S. Decennial Census; 2010 2020

=== Racial and ethnic composition ===
Rosaryville CDP, Maryland – Racial and ethnic composition Note: the US Census treats Hispanic/Latino as an ethnic category. This table excludes Latinos from the racial categories and assigns them to a separate category. Hispanics/Latinos may be of any race.
Race / Ethnicity (NH = Non-Hispanic)	Pop 2000	Pop 2010	Pop 2020	% 2000	% 2010	% 2020
White alone (NH)	4,105	1,199	784	33.31%	11.21%	6.79%
Black or African American alone (NH)	7,297	8,662	9,400	59.22%	80.98%	81.40%
Native American or Alaska Native alone (NH)	71	42	16	0.58%	0.39%	0.14%
Asian alone (NH)	323	168	183	2.62%	1.57%	1.58%
Native Hawaiian or Pacific Islander alone (NH)	9	8	11	0.07%	0.07%	0.10%
Other race alone (NH)	11	24	71	0.09%	0.22%	0.61%
Mixed race or Multiracial (NH)	245	275	422	1.99%	2.57%	3.65%
Hispanic or Latino (any race)	261	319	661	2.12%	2.98%	5.72%
Total	12,322	10,697	11,548	100.00%	100.00%	100.00%

=== 2020 census ===
As of the 2020 census, Rosaryville had a population of 11,548. The median age was 43.1 years. 20.5% of residents were under the age of 18 and 14.0% were 65 years of age or older. For every 100 females, there were 89.9 males, and for every 100 females age 18 and over, there were 85.5 males age 18 and over.

97.2% of residents lived in urban areas, while 2.8% lived in rural areas.

There were 3,861 households, of which 34.5% had children under the age of 18 living in them. Of all households, 54.5% were married-couple households, 13.2% were households with a male householder and no spouse or partner present, and 27.5% were households with a female householder and no spouse or partner present. About 17.3% of all households were made up of individuals, and 5.7% had someone living alone who was 65 years of age or older.

There were 3,965 housing units, of which 2.6% were vacant. The homeowner vacancy rate was 1.1%, and the rental vacancy rate was 3.8%.

=== 2000 census ===
As of the census of 2000, there were 12,322 people, 4,112 households, and 3,367 families residing in the CDP. The population density was 901.4 inhabitants per square mile (348.0/km^{2}). There were 4,267 housing units at an average density of 312.2 per square mile (120.5/km^{2}). The racial makeup of the CDP was 34.13% White, 59.57% African American, 0.64% Native American, 2.67% Asian, 0.11% Pacific Islander, 0.63% from other races, and 2.25% from two or more races. Hispanic or Latino of any race were 2.12% of the population.

There were 4,112 households, out of which 40.5% had children under the age of 18 living with them, 64.7% were married couples living together, 12.6% had a female householder with no husband present, and 18.1% were non-families. 14.3% of all households were made up of individuals, and 3.6% had someone living alone who was 65 years of age or older. The average household size was 2.99 and the average family size was 3.29.

In the CDP, the population was spread out, with 28.0% under the age of 18, 6.8% from 18 to 24, 32.3% from 25 to 44, 25.8% from 45 to 64, and 7.1% who were 65 years of age or older. The median age was 37 years. For every 100 females, there were 95.4 males. For every 100 females age 18 and over, there were 92.4 males.

The median income for a household in the CDP was $79,715, and the median income for a family was $85,225. Males had a median income of $48,776 versus $41,843 for females. The per capita income for the CDP was $27,817. About 1.7% of families and 2.9% of the population were below the poverty line, including 3.3% of those under age 18 and none of those age 65 or over.

== Government ==
Prince George's County Police Department District 5 Station in Clinton CDP serves the community.

== Education ==
Rosaryville residents are assigned to schools in Prince George's County Public Schools:

Elementary schools serving sections of the 2010 CDP include Melwood Elementary School and Rosaryville Elementary School.

Most residents are zoned to James Madison Middle School, with some zoned to Gwynn Park Middle School.

Dr. Henry A. Wise Jr. High School and Frederick Douglass High School serve sections of the CDP.
