= McCormick Tribune Freedom Museum =

Coordinates: 41°53′26.6″N 87°37′25.4″W

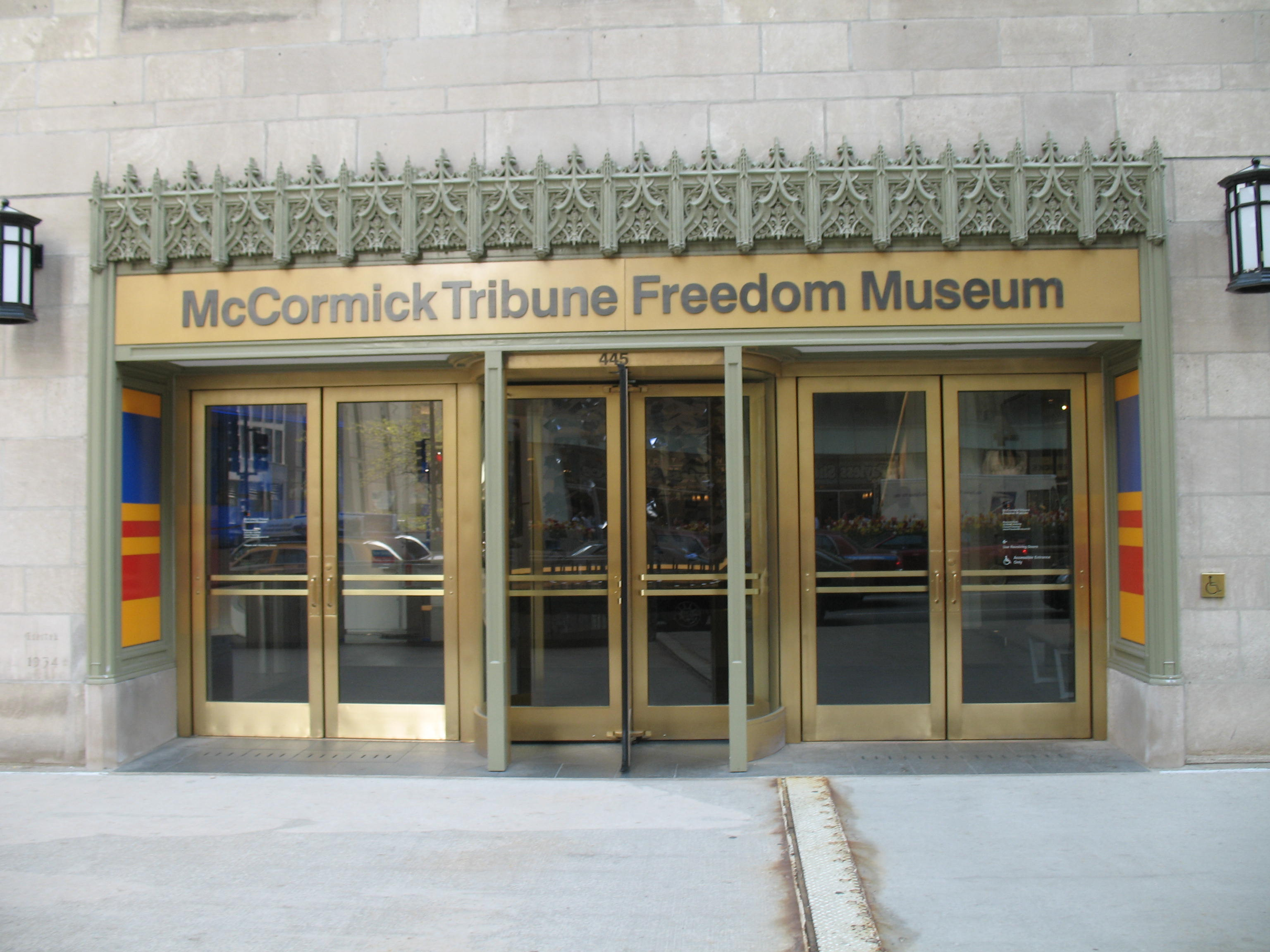
Magnificent Mile Entrance

The McCormick Freedom Museum was the first museum in the United States dedicated to the First Amendment by the McCormick Foundation. It was open from April 11, 2006, until March 1, 2009. The museum offered visitors an interactive experience focused on first amendment rights which include freedom of speech, freedom of religion, freedom of the press, assembly and petition. It was located on Michigan Avenue along the Magnificent Mile next to the historic Tribune Tower.

A sculpture by artists Amy Larimer and Peter Bernheim, titled 12151791 was put into storage when the museum closed. Its title represents the date of December 15, 1791, when the United States Bill of Rights was ratified.

A scaled-down 45 feet (14 m) mobile version of the museum, dubbed the Freedom Express, made its debut in Chicago's Pioneer Court on May 27, 2010.
