= McCormick School of Engineering =

Engineering school of Northwestern University in Evanston, Illinois

Coordinates: 42°3′28.2″N 87°40′33.1″W

Northwestern University McCormick School of Engineering
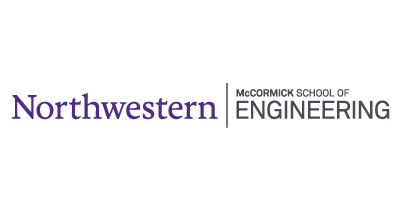
- Other names: Robert R. McCormick School of Engineering and Applied Science
- Former name: Northwestern Technological Institute
- Type: Private
- Established: 1909
- Parent institution: Northwestern University
- Dean: Christopher Schuh
- Faculty: 180
- Undergraduates: 2,231 (2025)
- Postgraduates: 1,121 (2010)
- Location: Evanston, Illinois, USA
- Campus: Suburban
- Website: mccormick.northwestern.edu

The Northwestern University McCormick School of Engineering (branded as Northwestern Engineering) is the engineering school of Northwestern University, a private university in Evanston, Illinois.

== History ==
The trustees of Northwestern University founded a College of Technology in June 1873, but in his report for 1876-77, President Oliver Marcy announced that the new college had failed for lack of financial resources to develop the faculty and facilities.

In 1891, President Henry Wade Rogers called for the founding of a new Engineering School, stating that universities in general were “not performing the work necessary to prepare men for the various activities of modern life, so different from the life their fathers lived half a century ago.” This was realized in 1909, when the new College of Engineering was opened in Swift Hall.

Operationally, the Engineering School until the mid-1920s was a department within the College of Liberal Arts. The major emphasis was on a broad general education with a particular stress on mathematics and science. In 1937, the Engineering School ran into difficulties with the American Engineers' Council for Professional Development, which denied the School accreditation. In response, a four-year curriculum satisfying the ECPD was put into place.

In 1939, Walter Patton Murphy (1873–1942), a wealthy inventor of railroad equipment, donated $6.735 million to the School of Engineering. Murphy meant for the Institute to offer a “cooperative” education, whereby academic courses and practical application in industrial settings were closely integrated. In 1942, Northwestern received an additional bequest of $28 million from Murphy's estate to provide for an engineering school "second to none." A cooperative education program was designed in the late 1930s by Charles F. Kettering, former research head of General Motors, and Herman Schneider, dean of the engineering school at the University of Cincinnati. The program required undergraduates to work outside the classroom in technical positions for several terms over the course of their college years.

In 1987, Julia R. Weertman was appointed chair of the department of materials science and engineering, making her the first woman to hold a chair position in an engineering school within the United States.

In 1989, the Northwestern Technological Institute was renamed Robert R. McCormick School of Engineering and Applied Science, following a US$30 million gift from the Robert R. McCormick Foundation.

=== Campus ===
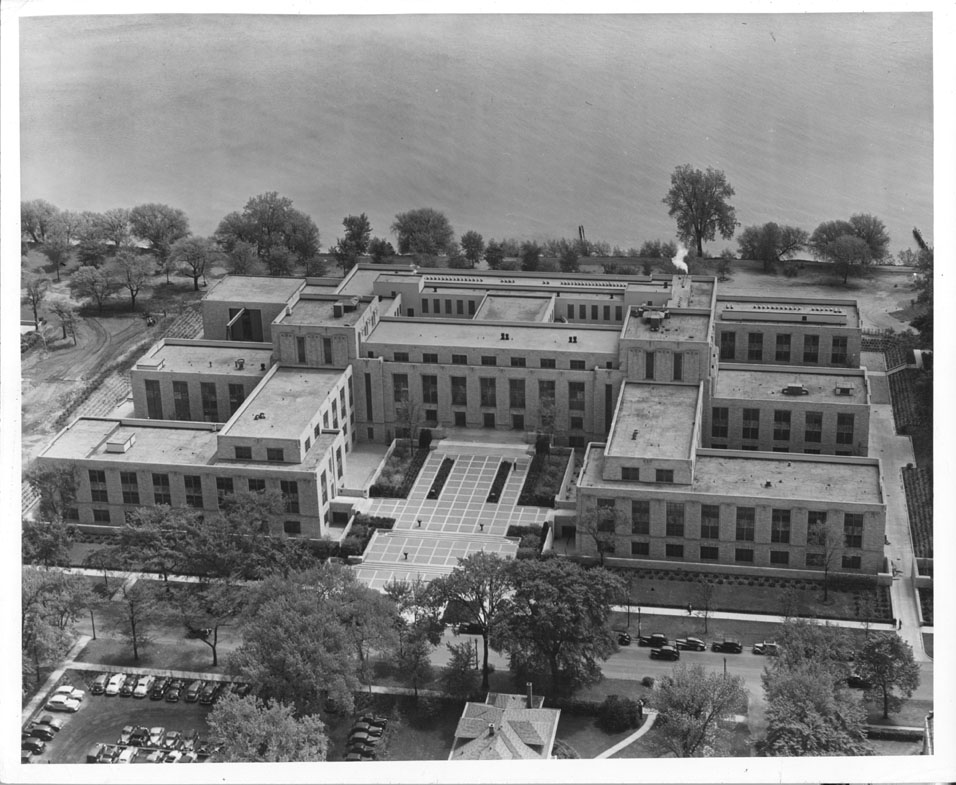
Technological Institute in 1942, before the construction of the Lakefill

Most engineering classes are held in the Northwestern Technological Institute building, which students refer to as "Tech." Ground was broken for the new building on April 1, 1940 and the building was dedicated on June 15–16, 1942. The building was designed in the shape of two letter E's, placed back to back and joined by a central structure. Each of the six original departments used one of the wings. When it was built it was the largest building on Northwestern's Evanston campus.

== Curriculum ==
As of 2010 a faculty of 180 taught 1450 undergraduates.

In 1996, Northwestern University launched an engineering program called Engineering Design and Communication (EDC), which is a mandatory class for all undergraduate engineering students. EDC consists of two quarter-long classes that focus on design and communication within the Engineering discipline. Each EDC class has 16 students who are team-taught by one professor from the McCormick School of Engineering and Applied Science and one professor from the Writing Program of the Weinberg College of Arts and Sciences. EDC classes typically work with the Rehabilitation Institute of Chicago or other local non-profit organizations. The EDC program was renamed Design Thinking and Communication, or DTC, beginning with the 2012-2013 school year.

The Engineering Analysis program is also mandatory for all undergraduate engineering students and consists of four quarter-long classes. These classes provide the basis for Northwestern's engineering curriculum, and teach linear algebra, statics and dynamics, system dynamics, and differential equations. In addition, students become familiar with the computer programming language MATLAB.

The graduate curriculum includes MMM program from the Segal Design Institute, a joint degree program including an MBA from the Kellogg School of Management and an MS in Design Innovation (MSDI) from McCormick. Historically, McCormick offered MEM for MMM graduates with few courses opted from different schools of the Northwestern University. Other Segal degrees include the Master of Product Design and Development Management (mpd^{2}) and MS in Engineering Design Innovation (EDI).

=== Co-op Program ===
The Walter P. Murphy Cooperative Engineering Education Program at Northwestern. Students work at a paid internship with one company for 3-6 academic quarters spread out throughout the students' undergraduate careers, including at least one period of two consecutive quarters. While participating in the co-op program, students maintain full-time student status.

== Enrollment ==
McCormick reports undergraduate enrollment and degree-completion data by Bachelor of Science program for ABET-related purposes. The school’s published totals counted 1,895 undergraduate majors in Winter 2017 and 2,231 majors in Fall 2025. The number of bachelor's degrees conferred increased from 410 in the 2015–16 academic year to 488 in the 2024–25 academic year.

As of Fall 2025, the three largest undergraduate majors were mechanical engineering, with 458 students; computer science, with 409 students; and biomedical engineering, with 265 students. Excluding the undecided category and McCormick Integrated Engineering Studies, which had one listed major, the three smallest Bachelor of Science programs were environmental engineering, with 46 students; manufacturing and design engineering, with 66 students; and civil engineering, with 88 students.

Undergraduate majors and degrees conferred
Enrollment term	Undergraduate majors	Degrees conferred	Academic year for degrees	Source
Winter 2017	1,895	410	2015–16	
Fall 2018	1,911	445	2017–18	
Fall 2020	1,866	457	2019–20	
Fall 2022	1,983	421	2021–22	
Fall 2023	2,046	460	2022–23	
Fall 2025	2,231	488	2024–25	

== See also ==
- Biomedical Engineering
- Center for Quantum Devices
- Chemical and Biological Engineering
- Civil and Environmental Engineering
- Electrical Engineering and Computer Engineering
- Computer Science
- Engineering Sciences and Applied Mathematics
- Industrial Engineering and Management Sciences
- Materials Science and Engineering
- Mechanical Engineering
- Segal Design Institute

== Student groups ==
McCormick students participate in a number of engineering design and project-based organizations. The Segal Design Institute describes student groups as opportunities to develop leadership skills and network with faculty, staff, and professionals. McCormick also maintains a list of undergraduate engineering student organizations, including design groups, vehicle teams, robotics, biomedical design, and aerospace organizations.

Among the school's vehicle-focused teams are Northwestern Formula Racing, also known as Formula SAE, which designs and builds formula-style race cars; Baja SAE, which designs and builds off-road vehicles for SAE-sponsored competitions; and the Northwestern University Solar Car Team, or NUsolar, which designs, builds, and races solar-powered vehicles.

Other project-based groups include NU Robotics Club, also known as NURC, which sponsors robotics projects and competitions; Medical Makers, which designs and builds medical devices for unmet clinical needs; and Northwestern University Space Technology and Rocketry Society, or NUSTARS, which participates in NASA-related rocketry and space technology competitions. In 2023, The Daily Northwestern reported that NURC's combat robotics team had competed at the Norwalk Havoc Robot League world championships, where its robot placed 13th worldwide in the 30-pound category. In 2024, a team including 25 Northwestern Engineering students won the Artemis Award, the highest honor at NASA's BIG Idea Challenge, for its proposal "METALS: Metallic Expandable Technology for Artemis Lunar Structures"; the team credited McCormick and NUSTARS with helping make the project possible.
