= Admerasia =

American advertising agency

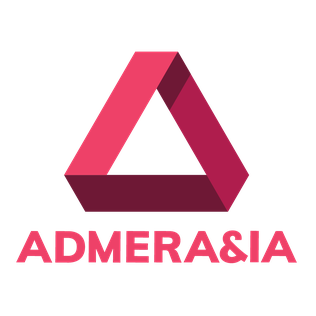
- Industry: Advertising
- Founded: 1993
- Founder: Zan Ng
- Headquarters: New York City, United States
- Key people: Zan Ng; (CEO); Jeff Lin; (co-founder); Joseph Liu; (co-founder); Tommy Ng; (general manager)
- Services: Advertising
- Website: admerasia.com

Admerasia is an American advertising company based in New York City. The company is known for its marketing of products from American companies to Asian American consumers.

== History ==
Admerasia was founded in 1993 by Zan Ng, a commercial photographer. He began the company with a personal investment of $250,000 that he and his brothers had saved up. In 1994, advertising executive Joseph Liu joined the company as a partner. Liu previously owned his own advertising company but joined Admerasia as he no longer wanted to deal with the risks associated with entrepreneurship. Both Ng and Liu came to the United States in 1975 in hopes of finding work as artists, Ng without any possessions and Liu with only a rice cooker.

== Ranking ==
Crain's ranked Admerasia as one of the 25 largest minority-owned business in New York in 2010, and Advertising Age ranked it as the No. 3 agency with the highest Asian American advertising revenue in 2012. Admerasia clients have included MCI, Foxwoods, Mercedes-Benz, Nissan Motor Company, State Farm and Citibank.

== Recognition ==
In addition to being recognized as one of the largest Asian American advertising agencies in the United States, Admerasia has received multiple awards. In 2005, they received a 10 Year Recognition Award from Asian Women in Business for their community service and dedication to American Women in Business' mission. The company received a Silver Award from the Asian American Advertising Federation in 2013 for its Nissan Altima advertising campaign. Admerasia won awards for both first and second place for Advertising Campaign of the Year at the 2019 3AF Summit for their work on 2018 "The Smart Living Campaign" for State Farm and 2018's "The Yum Chat Series." for Twin Marquis. Admerasia is also a regular at The Telly Awards having collected 15 awards for various campaigns since 2006.
