= William Mullen =

William Mullen may refer to:

- Billy Mullen (1896–1971), baseball player
- William Mullen (journalist) (born 1944), American editor and correspondent
- William F. Mullen III, United States Marine Corps general

== See also ==
- William Mullan (1928–2018), Scottish football referee
- Williams Mullen, U.S. law firm
