= Crain's Chicago Business =

Weekly business newspaper in Chicago, Illinois

- Cover from December 19, 2013
- Editor: Ann Dwyer
- Categories: Business
- Frequency: Weekly
- Publisher: Jim Kirk
- Total circulation: 49,005 (2013)
- First issue: 1978; 48 years ago
- Company: Crain Communications Inc.
- Country: United States of America
- Language: English
- Website: www.chicagobusiness.com
- ISSN: 0149-6956 (print); 1557-7902 (web)
- OCLC: 42883889

Crain's Chicago Business is a weekly business newspaper in Chicago, IL. It is owned by Detroit-based Crain Communications.

== History ==
The first issue of Crain's Chicago Business is dated April 17, 1978. In 1977, when Crain Communications chief Rance Crain went to Houston to give a speech to the Houston Advertising Club, he spent an afternoon listening to the publisher of the Houston Business Journal explain how his publication was developed. "I figured if a business publication worked well in Houston, it would be twice as successful in Chicago," Rance Crain said.

Rance Crain was the newspaper's first editor-in-chief, while Art Mertz (1917–1993), a longtime sales manager at Crain Communications' Advertising Age magazine, served as its first publisher. Rance tapped Steve Yahn, a senior editor at Advertising Age, to develop the prototype, do the initial hiring, and get the paper going, effectively acting as the paper's first editor. "We wanted to call it Chicago Business, but another guy came out with a paper with a similar name [which was short-lived]," Yahn said. "I told Rance he ought to put the Crain name on our publication to differentiate them, and he did."

Crain's was originally planned to publish every other week, but with the demise of the Chicago Daily News that year, those creating Crain's decided to make it a weekly publication, using the end of the Daily News for marketing purposes and also drawing on editorial talent from the failed paper.

The first newsstand issue of Crain's Chicago Business appeared on Monday, June 5, 1978, a 46-page edition with an exclusive lead story on how the Marshall Field & Co. department store chain was planning further suburban expansion.

To promote the new paper, Rance handed out free issues to commuters at Union Station during the morning rush hour. "While I was passing out copies, a newsstand vendor in the station came up to me," Rance recalled. "He said, 'I sure hope you don't have much of your own money tied up in this, because it's not going to work.'"

The Chicago business community also greeted the new journal with cynicism. "We would be working on stories and call sources, saying we were with Crain's Chicago Business," said Sandy Pesmen, feature editor at Crain's and former feature writer at the Daily News. "They would say 'Who? What? The people who make the toilets?' Some thought we were the plumbing manufacturer [Crane Co.]. Pretty soon, we were introducing ourselves by saying, "Hello, this is so-and-so from C-R-A-I-N's Chicago Business."

One of Crain's's biggest assets from the beginning was its physical appearance. "The first major sign of encouragement we got was for our lively, contemporary look," Steve Yahn said. "A lot of people said it looked as much like a book about the city as a financial publication. And that was exactly the intent — Crain's was meant to be a 'hybrid' between a city publication and a financial publication."

From the start, it strove to build its reputation with enterprise reporting. "Rance loves scoops," former Crain's editor Dan Miller said. "And the 'scoops mentality' became immediately ingrained in the culture of the new reporters we brought in."

However, one of those early scoops caused a firestorm that threatened to severely damage the new paper's reputation. In late July, Crain's learned through sources in the Chicago advertising community that Sears, Roebuck & Co. planned to drastically curtail its advertising. The banner story on August 7, with the headline "Sears slashes TV, print ad budgets," stated that cuts could reach the $100 million mark. The giant retailer angrily denied the report. "They called it preposterous," Yahn said. "As a result, we suffered credibility problems around town. From early August until mid-October, we kept trying to find a way to get it back."

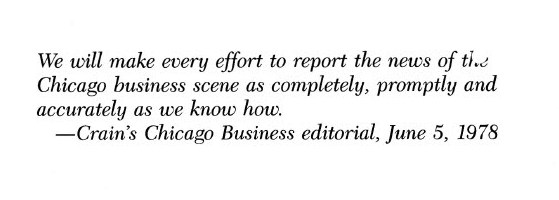
Crain's Chicago Business editorial, June 5, 1978

Then came the break that stunningly and permanently reversed Crain's fortunes. "A young Sears public relations man named Wiley Brooks came to see Rance on a job interview," Yahn said. "He wanted to be CCB managing editor [a slot that would open up according to plans when Dan Miller replaced Yahn as editor]. Brooks told Rance that our earlier article about Sears's ad cuts was true, that he had the proof, and that there was to be a massive reorganization of the company."

Brooks' proof was a voluminous, secret five-year plan referred to informally at Sears as the "Yellow Book." Brooks proceeded to leak the plan to Crain's in three sections. "Each one cost Crain's a lunch at Nick's Fishmarket [a pricey Chicago eatery]," Yahn said. "I still remember sprinting through the downtown streets with the first part of the book in a manila folder. Our whole reputation for accuracy was on the line."

In a bylined piece by Yahn, Crain's broke the story of Sears's secret plan on December 4 with a highly detailed 10-page package that included charts, graphs, and numerous sidebars drawn from the plan. "It made our reputation," Yahn said. "TV picked up on it in a big way on the weekend before we hit the streets. And on Monday, copies were gone by 9 A.M. and newsstands were calling for replacements. We were interviewed by BBC and covered by Business Week, and Business Week was after us for original documents. Sears did not respond."

Crain's continued to go after exclusives aggressively. "Our idea was to scoop the dailies, to print news people hadn't seen before," Rance said. "We pursued middle-sized companies because the dailies weren't covering them. We got great publicity for the Sears story; one national publication called us 'feisty.' In a way it changed the perception of the company. Here in Chicago, we weren't well-known, but as we started getting scoops, we build our identity in the city."

Encouraged by the success of Crain's Chicago Business, its parent company followed with three more business tabloids, Crain's Cleveland Business (1980s), Crain's Detroit Business, and Crain's New York Business, which started within weeks of each other early in 1985.

In more recent years, Crain's has continued to shift with the ever-evolving publishing world, making a push to an integrated print and digital newsroom. The paper has also expanded its coverage to include more political news, with an award-winning team, including reporters Tom Corfman, Greg Hinz, and Rich Miller. Crain's addition of Chicago sports business news, dining reviews, exercise features, and fashion reports also exemplifies how the paper has progressed as it seeks to compete with other city publications.

In 2012, Crain's moved from 360 N. Michigan Avenue into its new headquarters in the Crain Communications Building at 150 N. Michigan Avenue, Chicago 60601.

In June 2012, Crain's introduced a metered subscription plan for its website, also known as a paywall.

== Staff ==
While Steve Yahn was Crain's founding editor, Dan Miller was quickly picked up from the failed Chicago Daily News staff and named editor in November 1978. He stayed on as editor for ten years.

In 1989, Mark Miller was named editor of Crain's, succeeding Dan Miller (no relation), who had left to oversee Crain Communications' City & State magazine. Between 1982 and 1989, Mark Miller had been the managing editor of Crain's. Mark Miller served as Crain's editor from 1989 until leaving in 1993 to join the Chicago Sun-Times as deputy managing editor.

In 1993, current Crain's publisher, David Snyder became the editor. He held this position until 2000 when he became general manager/interactive and directed the relaunch of the Crain's website, ChicagoBusiness.com. Snyder started at Crain's as a beat reporter and was associate publisher before his promotion to his current role.

After numerous reporter positions, Robert Reed, became editor of Crain's from 2000 to 2003. Reed stayed in the job until leaving Crain's in early 2003. He then moved to Bloomberg Businessweek, Illinois Governor Pat Quinn's office and later led the investigative team at Chicago's Better Government Association. Reed now is a columnist for the Chicago Tribune.

In November 2003, the paper hired Jeff Bailey from The Wall Street Journal's Chicago bureau to be the editor of Crain's.

In February 2005, Bailey left Crain's after just 15 months in the job, telling his colleagues that he and the paper's publisher, David Blake, "did not get along well enough to be a team." During Bailey's time at the helm, more than a half dozen veteran staffers left the paper, including Steven Strahler (who subsequently remained with the paper as a contract writer—a position he holds to this day) and Jeff Borden. Bailey was replaced by the paper's longtime managing editor, Joseph B. Cahill. Cahill remained editor until 2011, when he stepped down to become a general business columnist for Crain's. He is now a Crain's blogger and columnist.

On December 12, 2008, Crain's laid off three editorial staffers, including reporter Bob Tita, a copy editor and an art director. The reductions of one full-time position and two part-time positions were part of a companywide reduction of 60 people across 32 Crain Communications magazines.

In March 2009, Crain's laid off three more editorial employees, including Bruce Blythe, an assistant managing editor, and also cut employees' pay by 10 percent, companywide.

In June 2010, Brandon Copple, who had been managing editor of Crain's since 2005, left to join Groupon in a similar role.

In February 2011, Jim Kirk, a former Chicago Tribune business editor who most recently had been managing editor of the nonprofit Chicago News Cooperative, joined Crain's as chief of editorial operations. He left in 2012 to become Senior Vice President and Editor in Chief of Chicago Sun-Times Media.

In March 2012, Michael Arndt was named editor of Crain's. He is the former senior editor and senior correspondent for Bloomberg Businessweek. He began with Crain's in 2010 as managing editor and currently oversees an integrated print and digital newsroom.

In February 2015, Crain's laid off five editorial staffers, including Washington, D.C. bureau chief Paul Merrion and assistant managing editor for digital Aris Georgiadis and multimedia producer Jeff Hartvigsen.

In February 2016, Crain's named Ann Dwyer the magazine's managing editor.

In March 2016, Crain's senior reporter and columnist Shia Kapos left the magazine after 10 years.

In November 2016, Crain's laid off three editorial staffers, including assistant managing editor Tom Corfman, assistant managing editor Craig Newman and copy editor Rich Skews. That same week, publisher (and former editor) David Snyder and associate publisher Lisa Emerick both announced they would leave the magazine at the end of the year.

In December 2016, Crain's longtime editorial cartoonist, Roger Schillerstrom, left the publication after 34 years on staff.

In July 2017, Crain's underwent more job cuts, which resulted in the departure of executive director of digital product development and innovation Robert K. Elder.

In November 2017, Mary Kramer was named group publisher for Crain's.

In October 2018, Crain's named Jim Kirk as publisher and executive editor.

In November 2018, Michael Arndt resigned as editor of Crain's.

In January 2019, Crain's named Ann Dwyer the magazine's editor, the first woman to hold the position.

In February 2019, Crain's hired Amy Guth to host a daily podcast.

== Awards ==
In 2014, Crain's received the Jesse Neal Award from the Association of Business Information and Media Companies in the best single article category for "Reckless Abandon", an in-depth examination of the real estate collapse in Chicago. Crain's also won four Society of American Business Editors and Writers (SABEW) awards for several articles, including a Best in Business Award for Meribah Knight's "A Business of Life and Death" series of articles. In 2013, Crain's won an EPPY from Editor & Publisher for best business/finance site in the U.S. with fewer than 1 million individual readers a month. It was also honored with a Jesse Neal Award for best use of video and two SABEW awards for best feature and best feature by weekly and biweekly publications.

In 2012, Crain's received four Peter Lisagor awards from the Chicago Headline Club, three Society of American Business Editors and Writers awards and a record 14 awards from the Alliance of Area Business Publications.

In addition, Crain's launched an iPad app in 2012, which is on the Apple App Store's top 10 list of most downloaded Business or Investing apps.

== Lists and annual features ==
40 Under 40 Class of 2013

Crain's publishes several lists annually, including "Chicago's Best Places to Work", "Who's Who" in Chicago business, "Chicago's Fast Fifty" about the city's fastest-growing businesses, "Tech 50", "Twenty in their 20s", and 40 Under 40.

Crain's 40 Under 40 list, which highlights up-and-coming Chicagoans in several fields including technology, advertising and politics, has featured several notable figures, including President Barack Obama (1993), Oprah Winfrey (1989), Chicago Mayor Rahm Emanuel (1990), Charlie Trotter (1992), Nate Silver (2008) and others. The 2013 list included rapper Lupe Fiasco, Divergent author Veronica Roth and filmmaker Joe Swanberg.

All of the lists Crain's publishes each year can be found in its Book of Lists, a compilation of business lists released annually.
