= Shizuko Hoshi =

Japanese and American actress

- Born: Japan
- Occupations: Actress, theater director, dancer, choreographer
- Years active: 1972–2005
- Spouse: Mako
- Children: 2

Shizuko Hoshi (星 静子, Hoshi Shizuko) is a Japanese and American actress, theater director, dancer and choreographer. Born in Japan, she is a graduate of Tokyo Women's College and University of Southern California. She was married to actor Mako, the founding artistic director of East West Players in Los Angeles, and worked closely with the Asian-American theatre company from 1965 to 1989.

== Career ==
Shizuko Hoshi arrived in the United States in 1957 and enrolled at the University of Southern California. Hoshi won the US Open women's singles titles in table tennis in 1958 and 1959. She stopped tournament play following her marriage to Mako.

While at East West Players, Hoshi received many awards for performance, directing and choreography, including a Los Angeles Drama Critics Circle Award for Featured Performance in Wakako Yamauchi's And the Soul Shall Dance, as well as Drama-Logue Awards for Best Director for Hokusai Sketchbooks, Asa ga Kimashita, A Chorus Line and Mishima. Her film credits include Memoirs of a Geisha, Come See the Paradise and M. Butterfly.

She appeared in the indie film, Charlotte Sometimes and narrated the Academy Award-winning Live Action Short Film, Visas and Virtue. She has also appeared on television, in such shows as Chicago Hope and M*A*S*H*. In 1995, Hoshi co-directed the English language premiere of the Japanese comedy The Fall Guy off-Broadway in New York City.

== Personal life ==
Hoshi was married to Mako until his death in 2006. They have two daughters (both of whom are actresses) and two grandchildren.

== Filmography ==
Film
Year	Title	Role	Notes
1985	Sylvester	Mrs. Daniels	
1990	Come See the Paradise	Mrs. Kawamura	
1993	M. Butterfly	Comrade Chin	
1997	Visas and Virtue	Narrator (as Elderly Mrs. Sugihara)	Voice role, short film (Note: Also broadcast, in 1999, as a segment in the third ever episode of Independent Lens.)
2002	Charlotte Sometimes	Aunt	
2005	Memoirs of a Geisha	Sayuri Narration	Voice role

Television
Year	Title	Role	Notes
1971	The Mary Tyler Moore Show	Hostess/The Waitress	Episode: "I Am Curious Cooper"
1972, 1973	The Bob Newhart Show	Hostess/The Waitress	2 episodes
1974	Fer-de-lance	Suan Kuroda	TV movie
1975	Police Story	Bin Han	Episode: "Year of the Dragon: Part 2"
1975	The Six Million Dollar Man	Japanese Woman	Episode: "The Wolf Boy"
1977	Quincy M.E.	Mom Kamura	Episode: Touch of Death
1977	Starsky and Hutch	Mrs. Hong	Episode: Manchild on the Streets
1978	My Husband Is Missing	Vice Consul	TV movie
1974, 1976, 1979	M*A*S*H	Mrs.Li/Mother/The Mother	4 episodes
1982	Dangerous Company	Mrs. Hikaru	TV movie
1983	Baby Sister	Mrs. Chang	TV movie
1990	Hiroshima: Out of the Ashes	Nurse Yama	TV movie
1996	Chicago Hope	Baby Doctor	Episode: The Parent Rap
1998	C-16: FBI		
