= Grumman (disambiguation) =

Grumman was an aircraft producer.

Grumman may also refer to:

- Northrop Grumman, an aerospace and defense conglomerate

== People ==
- Cornelia Grumman (fl. 1981–present), American journalist
- Leroy Grumman (1895–1982), an American industrialist and aeronautical engineer, who founder of the Grumman Aircraft Engineering Corporation

== Ships ==
- USNS Leroy Grumman (T-AO-195), a U.S. Navy fleet replenishment oiler in service since 1989

== Fiction ==
- Grumman (Dune), a fictional planet in Frank Herbert's Dune universe
- Stanislaus Grumman, a fictional character in the His Dark Materials series
