= Come See the Paradise =

1990 historical drama film by Alan Parker

- Theatrical release poster
- Directed by: Alan Parker
- Written by: Alan Parker
- Produced by: Robert F. Colesberry; Nellie Nugiel
- Starring: Dennis Quaid; Tamlyn Tomita; Sab Shimono; Shizuko Hoshi
- Cinematography: Michael Seresin
- Edited by: Gerry Hambling
- Music by: Randy Edelman
- Distributed by: 20th Century Fox
- Release date: December 23, 1990
- Running time: 138 minutes
- Country: United States
- Language: English
- Budget: $17.5 million
- Box office: $947,306

Come See the Paradise is a 1990 American historical drama film written and directed by Alan Parker, and starring Dennis Quaid and Tamlyn Tomita. Set before and during World War II, the film depicts the treatment of Japanese Americans in the United States following the attack on Pearl Harbor, and the subsequent loss of civil liberties within the framework of a love story.

== Plot ==
In the early 1950s, Lily Kawamura tells her pre-adolescent daughter Mini about her father and the life that she barely remembers, as the two of them are walking to a rural train station.

In 1936, Jack McGurn is a motion picture projectionist, involved in a campaign of harassment against non-union theaters in New York City. One such attack turns fatal, as one of his fellow union members starts a fire. McGurn's boss, knowing that the feelings of guilt would likely cause Jack to go to the police, urges him to leave the city. Jack moves to Los Angeles where his brother Gerry lives. Jack's role as a "sweatshop lawyer" strains an already-rocky relationship with Gerry who is willing to have any job, barely keeping his family afloat during the Great Depression.

Taking the name McGann, Jack finds a job as a non-union projectionist in a movie theater run by a Japanese American family by the name of Kawamura. He falls in love with Lily, his boss' daughter. Forbidden to see one another by her Issei parents and banned from marrying by California law, the couple elopes to Seattle, where they marry and have a daughter, Mini.

When World War II breaks out, Lily and their daughter are caught up in the Japanese American internment, rounded up and sent to Manzanar, California. Jack, away on a trip, is drafted into the United States Army with no chance to help his family prepare for their imprisonment.

Finally visiting the camp, he arranges a private meeting with his wife's father, telling him that he has gone AWOL and wants to stay with them, whatever they have to go through. They are his family now and he belongs with them. The older man counsels him to return to the Army, and says that he now believes that Jack is truly in love with Lily, and a worthy husband.

Returning, ready to face his punishment for desertion, he is met by FBI agents, who have identified "McGann" as being the McGurn wanted for his part in the arson of years before.

Finally, in the 1950s, the train arrives and Lily and Mini reunite with Jack, who has served his time in prison and is now returning to his family.

== Title ==
The title of the film is inspired by a line of the short poem "I Hear The Oriole's Always-Grieving Voice" by Russian poet Anna Akhmatova, which ends with the following lines:

I don't expect love's tender flatteries,
In premonition of some dark event,
But come, come and see this paradise

Where together we were blessed and innocent.

Writer Alan Parker was unable to locate Akhmatova's original poem and wrote his own poem before writing the script to try and say what the film would say:

We all dream our American dreams
When we're awake and when we sleep
So much hope that grief belies
Far beyond the lies and sighs
Because dreams are free
And so are we

Come See the Paradise

== Cast ==
- Dennis Quaid as Jack McGurn / McGann
- Tamlyn Tomita as Lily Yuriko Kawamura / McGann
- Sab Shimono as Hiroshi Kawamura
- Shizuko Hoshi as Mrs. Kawamura
- Joe Lisi as Detective
- George P. Wilbur as Theater Man#1
- Darren Cram as Military Police #2
- Stan Egi as Charlie Kawamura
- Ronald Yamamoto as Harry Kawamura
- Akemi Nishino as Dulcie Kawamura
- Naomi Nakano as Joyce Kawamura
- Brady Tsurutani as Frankie Kawamura
- Elizabeth Gilliam as Younger Mini McGann
- Shyree Mezick as Middle-aged Mini McGann
- Caroline Junko King as Older Mini McGann
- Pruitt Taylor Vince as Augie Farrell
- Colm Meaney as Gerry McGurn
- Becky Ann Baker as Marge McGurn

== Reception ==
On review aggregator Rotten Tomatoes, the film has a 'fresh' 64% rating based on 11 reviews, with an average rating of 5.5/10. Noted Chicago Sun Times critic Roger Ebert gave it 3 stars out of 4 and wrote that "Come See the Paradise is a fable to remind us of how easily we can surrender our liberties, and how much we need them." The film was entered into the 1990 Cannes Film Festival.

=== Awards and nominations ===
Award	Category	Subject	Result
Cannes Film Festival	Palme d'Or	Alan Parker	Nominated
Political Film Society Award	Human Rights	Alan Parker	Nominated
Young Artist Awards	Best Young Supporting Actor	Brady Tsurutani	Nominated

== Legacy ==
A 2014 study by Gabriel Rossman and Oliver Schilke, two sociologists at the University of California at Los Angeles (UCLA), identified Come See the Paradise as the most deliberate example of Oscar bait in their study of 3,000 films released since 1985. The identification is based on various elements calculated to be likely to draw Oscar nominations, including the previous nominations of Parker, the film's setting in Hollywood (including Quaid's projectionist character), and its depiction of a tragic historical event against the background of war and racism. It was only released in a few cities during the last week of that year to make it eligible for the awards. However, it was not nominated for any Oscars and failed at the box office.

== Home video releases ==
The VHS tape was released June 12, 1991. The DVD version was released June 6, 2006 and included a 2-sided disc:

- Side A: Movie, audio commentary by writer/director Sir Alan Parker
- Side B: Images of Come See the Paradise featurette, The Making of the Film essay by Sir Alan Parker, Rabbit in the Moon 1999 documentary, theatrical trailers

The film made its Blu-ray debut in November 2012 in Sweden.

== Soundtrack legacy ==
The film's score by Randy Edelman became oft used for musical cues in the trailers of other films, including those for A Few Good Men, Thirteen Days, Clear and Present Danger, Patriot Games, The Sum of All Fears, Devil In A Blue Dress, Rob Roy, The Chamber, Instinct, and Cry, The Beloved Country.

== See also ==
- Cinema Paradiso – 1989 Oscar-winning film similar in content
- 1990 in film
- Academy Awards
