= Jack Fuller =

American novelist

- Born: Jack William Fuller; October 12, 1946; Chicago, Illinois, U.S.
- Died: June 21, 2016 (aged 69)
- Education: Homewood-Flossmoor High School; Medill School of Journalism; Yale Law School
- Occupations: Journalist; author
- Writing career
- Notable awards: Pulitzer Prize for Editorial Writing (1986)

Jack William Fuller (October 12, 1946 – June 21, 2016) was an American journalist who spent nearly forty years working in newspapers and was the author of seven novels and two books on journalism.

== Biography ==
Fuller was born in Chicago, Illinois. He was a 1964 alumnus of Homewood-Flossmoor High School in Flossmoor, Illinois, and a graduate of Northwestern's Medill School of Journalism and Yale Law School.

He began his journalism career as a copyboy for the Chicago Tribune. Later he became a police reporter, a war correspondent in Vietnam, and a Washington correspondent. He worked for City News Bureau of Chicago, The Chicago Daily News, Pacific Stars and Stripes, and The Washington Post, as well as the Tribune. Fuller won the Pulitzer Prize for Editorial Writing in 1986 for his Tribune editorials on constitutional issues.

During the administration of President Gerald Ford, Fuller served as Special Assistant to United States Attorney General Edward Levi.

From 1989 to 1997 he was editor and then publisher of the Chicago Tribune. From 1997 to 2005 he served as president of the Tribune Publishing Company.

He served on the board of the University of Chicago and the John D. and Catherine T. MacArthur Foundation.

Fuller died of cancer on June 21, 2016, at the age of 69.

== Selected works ==
- Convergence (Doubleday; University of Chicago Press, 1982) ISBN 978-0-226-26881-1
- Fragments (William Morrow; University of Chicago Press, 1984) ISBN 978-0-226-26886-6
- Mass (William Morrow, 1985) ISBN 0-688-04685-1
- Our Fathers' Shadows (William Morrow, 1987) ISBN 0-340-39878-7
- Legends' End (Hodder & Stoughton, 1990) ISBN 0-340-50982-1
- News Values: Ideas for an Information Age. Chicago: University of Chicago Press, 1996. ISBN 9780226268798
- Best of Jackson Payne: A Novel (Alfred Knopf; University of Chicago Press, 2000) ISBN 978-0-226-26868-2
- Abbeville (Unbridled Books, 2008) ISBN 978-1-932961-47-8
- What Is Happening to News: The Information Explosion and the Crisis in Journalism. Chicago: University of Chicago Press, 2010. ISBN 9780226268989 — Read an excerpt.
- Levi, Edward H. Restoring Justice: The Speeches of Attorney General Edward H. Levi Edited by Jack Fuller. Chicago: University of Chicago Press, 2013. ISBN 9780226041315
