= Chicago News Cooperative =

The Chicago News Cooperative was a not-for-profit, Chicago-based cooperative that was created to produce news stories about Chicago for various media organizations. It was formed in November 2009, distributed its content to The New York Times and shut down in February 2012.

== History ==
The Chicago News Cooperative was formed in October 2009 as the brainchild of journalist and author Peter Osnos. In November 2009, the cooperative started providing the content for a twice-a-week, two-page section in the Chicago edition of The New York Times. The cooperative had been funded primarily by the John D. and Catherine T. MacArthur Foundation.

The Chicago News Cooperative operated out of the offices of WTTW-TV in Chicago.

== Editors ==
The cooperative's staff included its editor and co-founder, former Chicago Tribune managing editor (and former Los Angeles Times editor) James O'Shea; its general manager and deputy editor, former Chicago Tribune business columnist David Greising; former Chicago Tribune photographer Jose More, Chicago Tribune City Hall reporter Dan Mihalopoulos, former Omaha World-Herald reporter Katie Fretland, former Chicago Tribune feature writer Don Terry, Meribah Knight, Hunter Clauss, Ash-har Quraishi and former Chicago Tribune sports editor Dan McGrath. Its advisory board included former Chicago Tribune editor Ann Marie Lipinski, while former Chicago Tribune managing editor for features James Warren was a regular columnist.

In February 2012 it was reported that The New York Times would stop carrying the cooperative's content on February 26, and the cooperative would shut down its website soon thereafter, after the Times declined the cooperative's request for additional funding.

== See also ==
- The Daily Signal
