= Ovie Carter =

American photographer (born 1946)

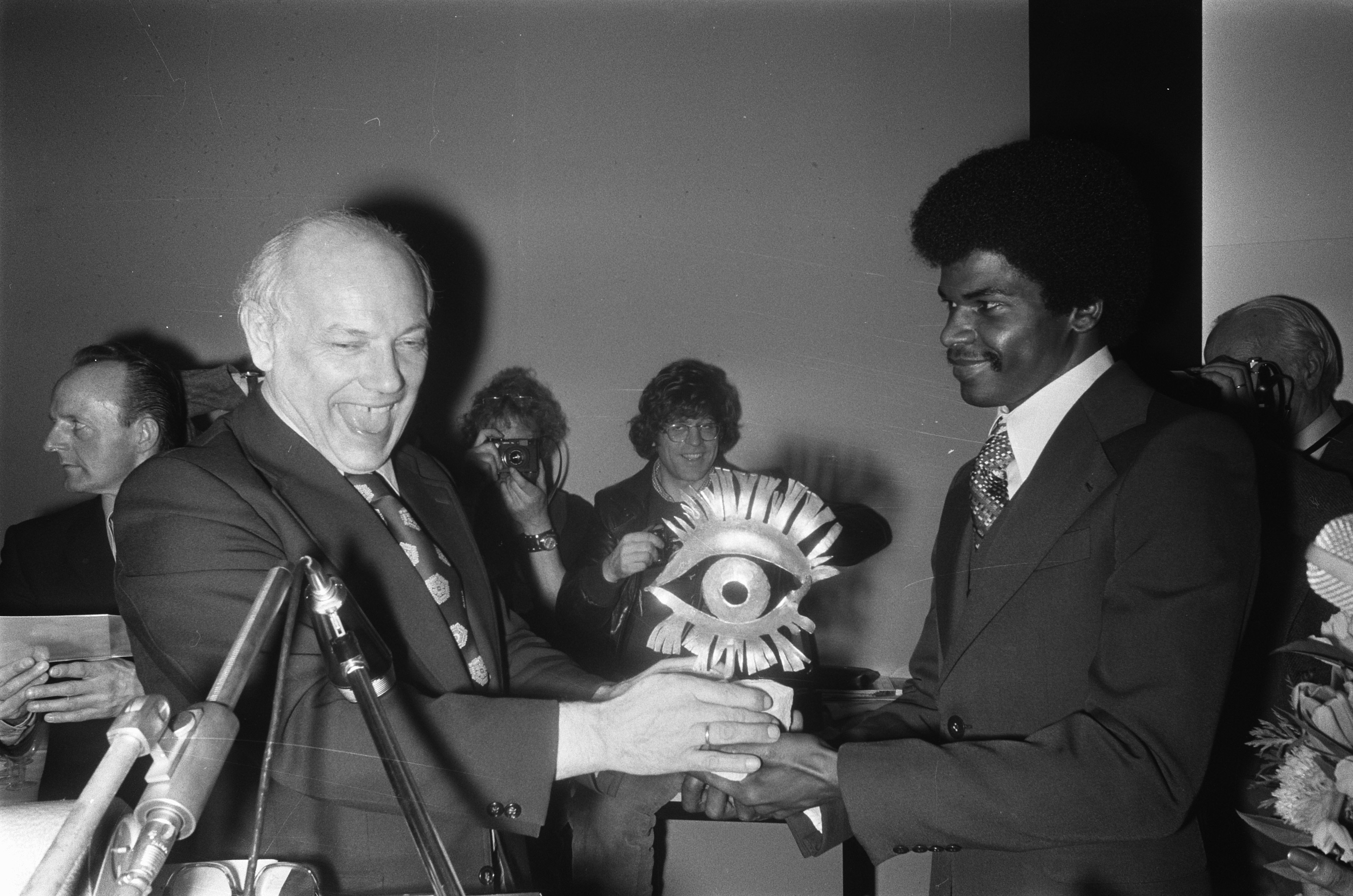
- Carter in 1975
- Born: March 11, 1946 (age 79); Indianola, Mississippi, U.S.
- Education: St. Louis Community College–Forest Park; Illinois Institute of Art – Chicago
- Occupation: Photographer
- Years active: 1969–2004
- Employer: Chicago Tribune
- Awards: Pulitzer Prize for International Reporting (1975)

Ovie Carter (born March 11, 1946) was an American photographer for the Chicago Tribune from 1969 to 2004. He won the Pulitzer Prize for International Reporting for his coverage of famine in Africa and India together with a reporter William Mullen.

== Early life and education ==
Ovie Carter was born and raised in Indianola, Mississippi. After graduating from Forest Park College in 1966 he had been serving for a year in the US Air Force. Then he continued his studies at the School of Photography at Illinois Institute of Art in Chicago.

== Career ==
Ovie Carter began his career in 1969 after being hired by the Chicago Tribune as a laboratory assistant. He was promoted to the photographer four months later. His photo reports covered mostly living in poor urban areas. He was the first photojournalist of 'Chicago Tribune who started to represent his work as photo-narration. For example, one of his first publications was a photo essay on drug addiction in 1970.

In 1973, Carter and three other African American photojournalists, Bob Black, Howard Simmons, and John White, taught photography at the South Side Community Art Center in Chicago, where they also mounted an exhibit entitled "Through the Eyes of Blackness." This exhibit was brought back fifty years later and opened on September 16, 2023 at the same location.

In 1974, Ovie Carter and William Mullen set off on a 10,000 miles journey across Africa and India to report about local famine. They created the five-part series "The Face of Hunger" and were awarded the Pulitzer Prize for International Reporting in 1975. Also, Carter won the top prize in the World Press Photo Contest. During his career Carter was also named Photographer of the Year by the Illinois Press Photographers Association; Overseas Press Club Award laureate; Chicago Tribune's Edward Scott Beck Award laureate and Excellence Award for photography laureate by the National Association of Black Journalists.

In 1992, Ovie Carter and sociologist Mitchell Duneier published the book Slim's Table: Race, Respectability, and Masculinity. Eight years later, they published the Sidewalk. In 2004 the photographer was retired.

== Selected publications ==
- 1999. (with Mitchell Duneier and Hakim Hasan) Sidewalk, Farrar Straus and Giroux, ISBN 978-0-374-52725-9
- 1992. (with Mitchell Duneier) Slim’s Table: Race, Respectability, and Masculinity, University of Chicago Press, ISBN 978-0-226-17030-5

== Books ==
- Brennan (1999). Who's who of Pulitzer Prize Winners. Westport: Greenwood Publishing Group. p. 666. ISBN 9781573561112.
- Fischer (2014). Foreign Correspondents Report From Africa: Pulitzer Prize Winning Articles and Pictures. Vienna: LIT Verlag Münster. p. 189. ISBN 9783643904416.
- Fischer, H. D. (2020). 1963–1977: From the escalation of the Vietnam war to the East Asian refugee problems. Vienna: Walter de Gruyter GmbH & Co KG. p. 383. ISBN 9783110863109.
