= Ash-har Quraishi =

American television journalist

- Born: January 5, 1975 (age 51); Chicago, Illinois
- Education: University of Illinois, Urbana-Champaign
- Occupation: Television journalist
- Agent: Ken Lindner & Associates
- Notable credit(s): CBS News Chicago Tonight, CNN, Al Jazeera America E.W. Scripps Co.
- Title: Correspondent CBS News

Ash-har Quraishi (born January 5, 1975) is an American broadcast journalist and national consumer correspondent for CBS News. He is a former reporter for WMAQ-TV in Chicago. He was previously the chief Midwest correspondent for now-defunct Al Jazeera America at its Chicago bureau. He has served as CNN's bureau chief in Islamabad. He later worked for WTTW-TV in Chicago and for the Chicago News Cooperative. He was born in Chicago.

== Early life ==
A Chicago native of Indian descent, Quraishi graduated from Von Steuben High School in Chicago and from the University of Illinois at Urbana-Champaign.

== Career ==
=== CNN ===
Quraishi served as CNN's Islamabad Bureau Chief covering news from across Pakistan, based there within days of the 9/11 attacks. In 2001 At the age of 26 he was CNN's youngest International Bureau Chief. While at the network he reported on political and military tensions between nuclear neighbors India and Pakistan and the hunt for Osama bin Laden on the volatile Pakistan/Afghanistan border. He covered the 2002 kidnapping and murder of The Wall Street Journal reporter Daniel Pearl, providing live reports from the port city of Karachi. He was live from the capital of Islamabad minutes after the bombing of a Protestant church within the diplomatic enclave. Quraishi also covered the 2002 Pakistani elections and was the first western journalist to report the capture of suspected 9/11 planner Khalid Shaikh Mohammed. Following the capture, Quraishi conducted an exclusive one-on-one interview with Pakistani President Pervez Musharraf. Quraishi was honored by the South Asian Journalists Association for his coverage of the 2002 parliamentary elections. In 2004 he was named one of the top 50 South Asian Global Achievers in Mass Media by Triangle Media Group.

=== NSA wiretapping ===
Quraishi was one of several journalists whose names were listed in a lawsuit filed by the American Civil Liberties Union against the NSA for illegal wiretaps. The ACLU accused the National Security Agency, Central Security Service and Lt. General Keith B. Alexander, director of the NSA, of illegally wiretapping conversations and monitoring e-mails between members of its organization and members of the media, including Quraishi. At the time Quraishi was reporting on a story about "special interest" detainees who had been detained and deported even though they had not been charged with any terrorist related activities.

=== KCTV ===
Quraishi next was Chief Investigative Reporter for CBS affiliate KCTV based in Kansas City. His reports have resulted in changes in police complaint procedures and changes in recruitment policies for the Missouri National Guard. His report on intimidation inside local police stations earned him a 2007 Regional Edward R. Murrow Award for investigative reporting. His investigations have been honored by the Society of Professional Journalists, The Kansas City Press Club, The South Asian Journalists Association and The National Academy of Television Arts and Sciences. In 2010, he was awarded two National Headliner Awards for his reporting and was also an Investigative Reporters and Editors (IRE) award finalist. He is a four-time Emmy winner and ten-time nominee for feature, specialty and investigative reporting. Since joining KCTV5, he has exposed sexual predators online, weak sentencing for child pornography convicts, serious security vulnerabilities in airport security and the ability of bad physicians to move from state to state, leaving behind serious malpractice histories. Quraishi was investigated by the Transportation Security Administration (TSA) under the Department of Homeland Security for a series of reports exposing vulnerabilities in aviation security. The TSA investigation was later dropped and the series earned Quraishi a 2009 Edward R. Murrow Award. He left KCTV in December 2009.

=== WTTW and the Chicago News Cooperative ===
On March 16, 2010, Chicago public television station WTTW and the Chicago News Cooperative announced the hiring of Quraishi as a multimedia correspondent and content producer who will alternate working for WTTW and the CNC each week. His duties included reporting for WTTW's "Chicago Tonight" program and its website, writing for the Chicago News Cooperative's pages in The New York Times, writing for the cooperative's website and helping to train cooperative employees in using video. He left the CNC to become a full-time correspondent for Chicago Tonight in April 2011.

=== Al Jazeera America ===
On 30 July 2013 it was announced Quraishi was hired by the now-defunct Al Jazeera America to serve as its chief correspondent for its Chicago bureau.

While covering the Ferguson protests in 2014, Ferguson police department shot rubber bullets and tear gas at an AJAM news crew setting up for a live shot including correspondent Quraishi, causing them to abandon their recording equipment and run to safety. Other incidents including the arrests of two print journalists for The Washington Post and The Huffington Post also occurred during the same time period. All the incidents were considered attacks on press freedom by the local and county police and led to the state police being put in charge as well as comments by President Barack Obama denouncing the actions.

== See also ==
- KCTV
- Al Jazeera America
- WMAQ-TV
