= Dangerous Company =

1997 book by Charles Madigan

Dangerous Company: The Consulting Powerhouses and the Businesses They Save and Ruin
- Author: James O'Shea; Charles Madigan
- Publisher: Crown Business
- Publication date: 1997
- Publication place: United States
- Media type: Hardcover
- Pages: 355
- ISBN: 0-8129-2634-X

Dangerous Company: The Consulting Powerhouses and the Businesses They Save and Ruin is a book written by James O'Shea and Charles Madigan.

It is one of several business books critical of the functioning and importance of the management consulting (strategy consulting) industry. The book discusses a range of representative cases and their handling by the top consulting powerhouses.

It was first published in 1997 by Crown Business (New York) as a 355-page hardcover (ISBN 0-8129-2634-X). Penguin Books published it as a paperback in 1998 (ISBN 0-14-027685-8).

== See also ==
- Management consulting
- McKinsey & Company
- Boston Consulting Group
- Bain & Company
