= Mitchell Duneier =

American sociologist (born 1961)

- Born: 1961 (age 64–65)

Academic background
- Education: University of Chicago
- Doctoral advisor: Howard S. Becker; Edward Shils

Academic work
- Discipline: Sociology
- Sub-discipline: Ethnography; urban sociology
- Institutions: Princeton University

Mitchell Duneier is an American sociologist and ethnographer. He is currently Maurice P. During Professor and department chair of Sociology at Princeton University and has also served as a regular Visiting Distinguished Professor of Sociology at the Graduate Center, CUNY.

Duneier earned his doctorate from the University of Chicago in 1992. His first book, Slim's Table: Race, Respectability, and Masculinity, won the 1994 American Sociological Association's award for Distinguished Scholarly Publication. He is also the author of Sidewalk (1999), which won the Los Angeles Times Book Prize and the C. Wright Mills Award. In 2016, he published Ghetto: The Invention of a Place, the History of an Idea with Farrar, Straus and Giroux, which was one of the New York Times Book Review Notable Books of the Year and one of the Best Books of the Year by Publishers Weekly. He was elected to membership in the American Academy of Arts and Sciences in 2021.

Duneier taught at the University of California-Santa Barbara, the University of Wisconsin-Madison before joining the Princeton faculty and the City University of New York (where he regularly taught in a visiting capacity). He served on the original advisory board for Public Radio International's This American Life.

He is the step-brother of Harvard political scientist Gary King.

== Selected publications ==
- 2006. "Ethnography, the Ecological Fallacy, and the 1995 Chicago Heat Wave," American Sociological Review 71.
- 2006. "Voices from the Sidewalk: Ethnography and Writing Race (in conversation with Les Back)," Ethnic and Racial Studies 29.
- 2006. "Sur la négligence théorique et autres écueils de l’ethnographie," Revue française de sociologie 1.
- 1999. (with Harvey Molotch). "Talking City Trouble: Interactional Vandalism, Social Inequality, and the 'Urban Interaction Problem,'" American Journal of Sociology 104(5).
- 1999. Sidewalk, (with Ovie Carter & Hakim Hassan). Farrar Straus and Giroux, ISBN 978-0-374-52725-9
- 1992. Slim’s Table: Race, Respectability, and Masculinity, (with Ovie Carter). University of Chicago Press, ISBN 978-0-226-17030-5
