= James Kelly (journalist) =

American journalist

James Kelly (1809–1895) was a founder of the Chicago Tribune, serving as a corporate manager among other roles when the first daily issue of the paper came out July 10, 1847, according to the recollection of a partner some 50 years later in the Tribune. The partner, Joseph K.C. Forrest, recalled his colleague as a "practical writer". But Kelly evidently left journalism for more profitable ventures: the recollection described him as involved in the wholesale leather trade.

Prior to producing the Chicago Daily Tribune, Kelly helped to create a literary journal, the Gem of the Prairie, which in the typically fast-moving style of frontier newspapers, experienced several name, format, and ownership evolutions prior to becoming the Tribune.

At the time of his death, The New York Times reported that Kelly was a man of property who "owned a great deal of property in and about Chicago".
