= Ann Marie Lipinski =

American journalist (born 1956)

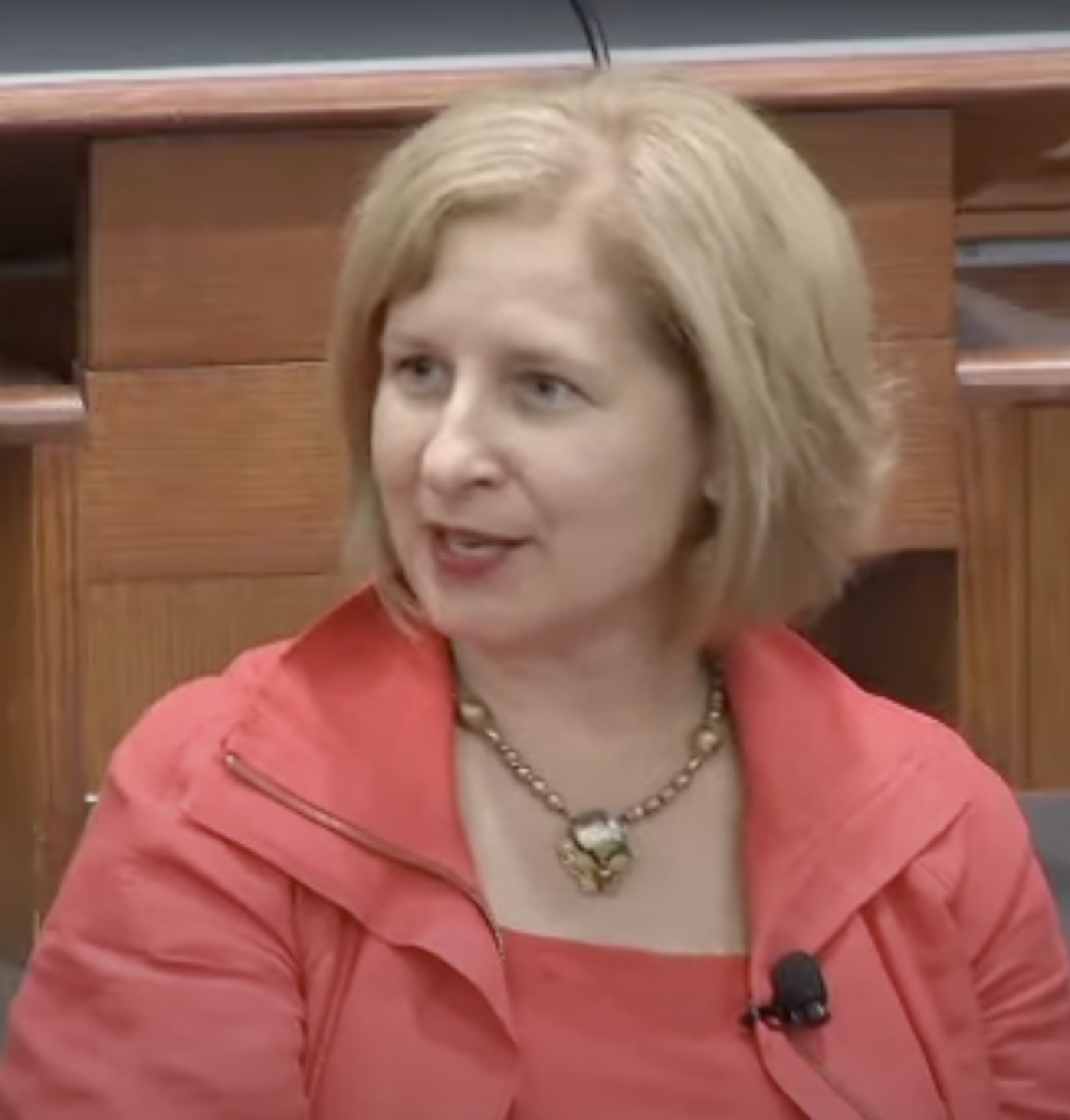
- Lipinski in 2011
- Born: Trenton, Michigan, United States; January 1956 (age 70)
- Education: University of Michigan (BA)
- Occupation: Journalist
- Known for: Curator of the Nieman Foundation for Journalism (2011–2025)

Ann Marie Lipinski (born January 1956) is an American journalist who served as curator of the Nieman Foundation for Journalism at Harvard from 2011 to 2025. She is the former editor of the Chicago Tribune and Vice President for Civic Engagement at the University of Chicago.

== Early life and education ==
Lipinski was raised in Trenton, Michigan, and edited Trenton High School's school paper during her senior year. She graduated from Trenton High in 1974 and was voted "most ambitious".

Lipinski attended University of Michigan and worked on the school's newspaper, The Michigan Daily. In the summer of 1977, between her junior and senior years, Lipinski interned at The Miami Herald, and co-edited The Michigan Daily in her senior year. Lipinski left the University of Michigan several credits short of her degree but was awarded a bachelor's degree in 1994 after the university deemed her internships worthy of the needed credits.

Lipinski joined the Chicago Tribune as an editorial intern in the summer of 1978.

== Career ==
After her internship at the Tribune, Lipinski was hired as a full-time reporter in 1978. She worked as a feature writer before switching to the metro staff in February 1985.

In 1987, Lipinski was part of a reporting team that investigated the Chicago City Council in a weeklong series that was published in late 1987, titled "City Council: The Spoils of Power." The team won the Pulitzer Prize for Local Reporting for its work. Lipinski was promoted to become the Tribune's metro editor in 1991 and its managing editor in 1995. In February 2001, Lipinski became the Tribune's editor and senior vice president, replacing Howard Tyner.

On July 14, 2008, Lipinski resigned as the paper's editor, saying she was no longer "a good fit" for the job.

In September 2008, Lipinski became the Vice President of Civic Engagement for the University of Chicago.

In October 2009, Lipinski became part of the advisory board of the Chicago News Cooperative, a new, nonprofit Chicago news-gathering operation providing local news articles to The New York Times.

She was chair of the board of the University of Chicago Charter School and served on the Pulitzer Prize board, acting as co-chair in her final year, as well as the boards of the Chicago Children's Choir and the Court Theatre. She serves on the Alumni Board of the University of Michigan.

On April 19, 2011, she was announced as the next curator of the Nieman Foundation for Journalism at Harvard, responsible for managing the Nieman Fellowships. She also sat on the advisory board of the Chicago News Cooperative until the organization ceased operations in 2012. Lipinski is one of the 25 leading figures on the Information and Democracy Commission launched by Reporters Without Borders.

== Personal ==
Lipinski and her husband, Steve Kagan, live in the Kenwood neighborhood of Chicago and have one daughter, Caroline Kagan.
