= James Warren (journalist) =

American journalist (born 1953)

- Born: April 1, 1953 (age 72); New York City, New York, U.S.

James C. Warren (born January 4, 1953) is an American journalist, currently the executive editor of NewsGuard, which rates the credibility of news and information sites. Previously, he was chief media writer for the Poynter Institute, a national affairs columnist for U.S. News & World Report, and Washington Bureau chief for the New York Daily News. He previously served as a founder of the Chicago News Cooperative and wrote its twice-weekly column in the Chicago edition of The New York Times. He was the managing editor at the Chicago Tribune when he left the paper in 2008. He was the Tribune′s Washington bureau chief from 1993 to 2001, and he appeared for three years on CNN's "Capital Gang Sunday" and regularly on "The McLaughlin Group". He was Chicago editor for The Daily Beast and has written regularly for the Huffington Post and The Atlantic Monthly, as well as for Vanity Fair. He appears regularly on MSNBC and WGN-TV in Chicago.

== Early life and education ==
Born in New York City and the son of a stockbroker, Warren was educated at Collegiate School, an independent college preparatory school in New York City, followed by Amherst College, where he earned a bachelor's degree in English, in 1974. He later earned a master's degree from Roosevelt University in Chicago.

== Professional career ==
Warren began his journalism career in the mid-1970s working as a reporter for the Newark Star-Ledger. In 1977, he joined the financial section of the Chicago Sun-Times, where he worked as a business reporter, a general assignment reporter, a legal affairs reporter and a labor reporter.

In 1984, Warren joined the Chicago Tribune as its labor and legal affairs writer. He later became the paper's media writer.

In mid-1992, Warren was named editor of the Tribune′s Tempo lifestyle section.

In mid-December 1993, Warren was chosen to become the Tribune′s Washington, D.C., bureau chief. Almost immediately after arriving in town, Warren attracted attention with his brash talk. "I have absolutely no desire to make this a long-term thing," he told the Chicago Reader in December 1992. "I have no desire to be there in five or ten years as part of the Gridiron Show, prancing around onstage, singing to the president, or whatever the fuck they do."

Warren also quickly attracted attention in D.C. by exposing the clubby ways of the star journalists in Washington. Warren in particular targeted broadcast journalists who were paid to give speeches to the organizations that they covered, including Lesley Stahl, Tim Russert and Jack Nelson. Warren saved his heaviest vitriol, however, for Cokie Roberts, whose speechifying Warren tracked regularly in his weekly Tribune column in a feature he dubbed "Cokie Watch."

Warren himself wound up on TV for three years while living and working in D.C. From 1995 until 1998, Warren became a regular panelist on CNN's political talk show Capital Gang Sunday, which was an offshoot of its show at the time, Capital Gang.

In 1997, Warren also began co-hosting a Sunday night radio show on WGN-AM with Michael Tackett entitled Unconventional Wisdom. The show aired until early 2006, when WGN canceled it as part of a total overhaul of the station's weekend schedule.

The Washingtonian magazine chose Warren as one of the 50 best and most influential journalists in 2001.

In 2001, Warren returned to Chicago as the Tribune′s associate managing editor for features. In 2002, Warren became the Tribune′s deputy managing editor for features. In 2006, Warren became the paper's managing editor for features.

Warren left the Chicago Tribune in a power struggle in August 2008 after the paper got a new editor, Gerould W. Kern, and a new managing editor, Jane Hirt.

After leaving the Tribune, Warren began writing for the Huffington Post, continuing his longstanding practice of reviewing magazine articles. He also started writing for The Atlantic Monthly. In October 2009, Warren was named the publisher of the Chicago Reader alternative weekly newspaper in Chicago.

In November 2009, Warren began writing a regular column for the Chicago News Cooperative that appeared in The New York Times.

In March 2010, Warren stepped down as publisher of the Chicago Reader to focus more on the Chicago News Cooperative.

== Personal ==
Warren married then-Tribune editorial writer Cornelia Grumman in 2001. They have two sons, Blair and Eliot, and live in the Graceland West area of the Ravenswood neighborhood on Chicago's North Side.
