= William Mullen (journalist) =

American journalist (born 1944)

- Born: October 9, 1944 (age 81)
- Education: University of Wisconsin-La Crosse; University of Wisconsin in Madison
- Occupation: Journalist
- Awards: Pulitzer Prize

William Mullen (born October 9, 1944) is an American journalist, who was a reporter and correspondent for the Chicago Tribune, which he joined in 1967 and retired from in 2012. In 1972, he worked undercover in the Chicago Board of Election Commissioners, uncovering massive evidence of voting irregularities that resulted in 82 election officials being indicted by the federal government. The exposé was awarded the Pulitzer Prize for general local reporting in 1973. In 1975, Mullen and Chicago Tribune photographer Ovie Carter were awarded the Pulitzer for International Reporting for a six-part series on world hunger and famine.

== Early life and education ==
William Mullen was the fourth of six children born Melvin and Margaret Mullen. His parents were both of Norwegian descent, his father a telephone company technician, his mother a homemaker. Mullen attended public schools in La Crosse and was a graduate of La Crosse Central High School. He attended the University of Wisconsin-La Crosse from 1962 to 1965, then transferred to the University of Wisconsin in Madison, where he received a degree in Journalism in 1967. While in college, he worked as an intern at the La Crosse Tribune and as a weekend reporter at the Wisconsin State Journal in Madison.

== Career ==
Mullen joined the Chicago Tribune after graduating in 1967. His early years were largely spent as a nightside police reporter and as a rewriteman. When the Tribune had the opportunity to place a reporter undercover in the Board of Election Commissioners, Mullen was selected because his face was not a familiar one in Chicago City Hall.

During the summer and fall of 1974, Mullen and Ovie Carter were travelled across Africa and India. Their journey resulted in the series of illustrated articles "The Faces of Hunger", which brought Mullen a second Pulitzer Prize in 1975. Over the years, the journalist was awarded the Jacob Scher Award for Investigative Reporting; a three-time Edward Scott Beck Award winner; School of Journalism and Mass Communication University of Wisconsin Award.

From 1978 to 1981, Mullen served as the chief correspondent of the Chicago Tribune London Bureau, traveling extensively in Europe, the Middle East and Asia. In 1987 and 1988, Mullen compiled an award-winning series on refugees after spending a year traveling to refugee camps in Africa, the Middle East, Asia and Central America as a staff writer for the Chicago Tribune's Sunday Magazine. In the 1990s, he turned to writing on and reporting on cultural affairs and the natural sciences, an assignment that twice took him to Antarctica and the South Pole and on extended trips to the Peruvian Amazon to save a pristine forest from oil drilling.

== Personal life ==
Mullen and his wife, Sylvia, have a son, Eric, and his wife's son from a previous marriage, Theodore Esser IV.

== Bibliography ==
- Brennan, Elizabeth A. (1999). Who's Who of Pulitzer Prize Winners. Westport: Greenwood Publishing Group. p. 666. ISBN 9781573561112.
- Fischer, Heinz-Dietrich (2014). Foreign Correspondents Report From Africa: Pulitzer Prize Winning Articles and Pictures. Vienna: LIT Verlag Münster. p. 189. ISBN 9783643904416.
- Fischer, Heinz-Dietrich (2020). 1963–1977: From the escalation of the Vietnam war to the East Asian refugee problems. Vienna: Walter de Gruyter GmbH & Co KG. p. 383. ISBN 9783110863109.
