= The Jeffersonian (newspaper) =

Former weekly newspaper in Jeffersontown, Kentucky, USA

- Type: Weekly newspaper
- Format: Broadsheet
- Owner: The Jeffersonian Publishing Co. (Inc.)
- Publisher: W. C. Barrickman (1907–1913); J. C. Alcock; T .R. "Tommy" Jones; Alden J. Schansberg(1959–1965).
- Editor: C. A. Hummel (1940)
- Founded: June 13, 1907.
- Ceased publication: 1965
- Language: English
- Headquarters: Jeffersontown, Kentucky, U.S.

The Jeffersonian was a weekly newspaper published on Thursdays, in Jeffersontown, Jefferson County, Kentucky. The Jeffersonian was first published on June 13, 1907, and was last published in 1965.

== History ==
=== Beginning ===
The Jeffersonian was founded by W. C. Barrickman and J. C. Alcock.

Alcock later bought out Barrickman and became the sole owner of the paper.

In 1913 Alcock bought half of the old Jefferson County Bank's lot and, later in 1913, constructed a new building for The Jeffersonian. The new Jeffersonian building contained the offices and presses for the paper, In addition to The Jeffersonian, The St Matthews Sun was also printed and distributed from this building.

Although headquartered in, and focused on, Jeffersontown, Kentucky, The Jeffersonian reported on all of Jefferson County. The Jeffersonian reported from as far away as Bullitt and Spencer counties as well.

The Jeffersonian soon had upwards of forty reporters, much of The Jeffersonian's information came from a group of ladies, from various parts of Jefferson County, who gathered it up for the paper.

=== Decline ===
The Jeffersonian went into decline when the Kentucky statutes were changed to require that legal notices were to be printed in the newspaper of each county with the largest circulation. As The Jeffersonian was not the newspaper with the largest circulation in Jefferson County it lost a lot of advertising revenue that it had previously garnered from legal notices.

=== Demise ===
In 1959 Alden J. Schansberg bought The Jeffersonian. In 1965 Schansberg merged The Jeffersonian into the St. Matthews Voice.

== Bibliography ==
- The Jeffersonian, Jeffersontown, KY: The Jeffersonian Publishing Co. (Inc.), (December 5, 1940), pp. 1–2.
- Kleber, John E., ed. (2001). "Jeffersontown". The Encyclopedia of Louisville. Lexington, Kentucky: University Press of Kentucky. p. 442. ISBN 0-8131-2100-0. OCLC 247857447.
- Kentucky Division of Geographic Information Poster (2007).
- Retired Louisville Publisher Dies, Lexington, KY: Lexington Herald-Leader, (January 15, 1986), p. B7.
- The Register of the Kentucky State Historical Society Vol. 13, No. 37, Frankfort, KY: The Kentucky State Historical Society, (1915), p. 92.
