= Chicago Tribune =

Major American newspaper, founded 1847

- The front page of the Chicago Tribune on March 27, 2024
- Type: Daily newspaper
- Format: Broadsheet
- Owner: Tribune Publishing
- Founders: James Kelly; John E. Wheeler; Joseph K. C. Forrest
- Editor-in-chief: Mitch Pugh
- Managing editor: Stacy St. Clair
- General manager: Par Ridder
- Opinion editor: Chris Jones
- Photo editor: Todd Panagopoulos
- Founded: June 10, 1847; 179 years ago
- Language: English
- Country: United States
- Circulation: 44,100 Average print circulation 148,771 Digital Subscribers
- ISSN: 1085-6706 (print); 2165-171X (web)
- OCLC number: 7960243
- Website: chicagotribune.com

The Chicago Tribune is an American daily newspaper based in Chicago, Illinois, United States. Founded in 1847, it was formerly self-styled as the "World's Greatest Newspaper", a slogan from which its once-integrated WGN radio and WGN television received their call letters. It is the most-read daily newspaper in the Chicago metropolitan area and the Great Lakes region, and the sixth-largest newspaper by print circulation in the U.S.

In the 1850s, under Joseph Medill, the Chicago Tribune became closely associated with the Illinois politician Abraham Lincoln, and the then new Republican Party's progressive wing. In the 20th century, under Medill's grandson 'Colonel' Robert R. McCormick, its reputation was that of a crusading newspaper with an outlook that promoted American conservatism and opposed Franklin D. Roosevelt's New Deal. Its reporting and commentary reached markets outside of Chicago through family and corporate relationships at the New York Daily News and the Washington Times-Herald. Through much of the 20th century and into the early 21st, it employed a network of overseas news bureaus and foreign correspondents. In the 1960s, its corporate parent owner, Tribune Company, began expanding into new markets by buying additional daily papers. In 2008, for the first time in its history, its editorial page endorsed a Democrat, Barack Obama, a U.S. senator from Illinois, for U.S. president.

Originally published solely as a broadsheet, the Tribune announced on January 13, 2009, that it would continue publishing as a broadsheet for home delivery, but it would publish in tabloid format for newsstand, news box, and commuter station sales. The change, however, proved unpopular with readers; in August 2011, the Tribune discontinued the tabloid edition, returning to its established broadsheet format through all distribution channels.

The Tribune was owned by parent company Tribune Publishing. In May 2021, Tribune Publishing was acquired by Alden Global Capital, which operates its media properties through Digital First Media. Since then, the newspaper's coverage has evolved away from national and international news and toward coverage of Illinois and especially Chicago-area news.

The Tribune settled a lawsuit over illegal charges to consumers in 2013 and was sued again for deceptive billing practices in 2023.

== History ==
=== 19th century ===
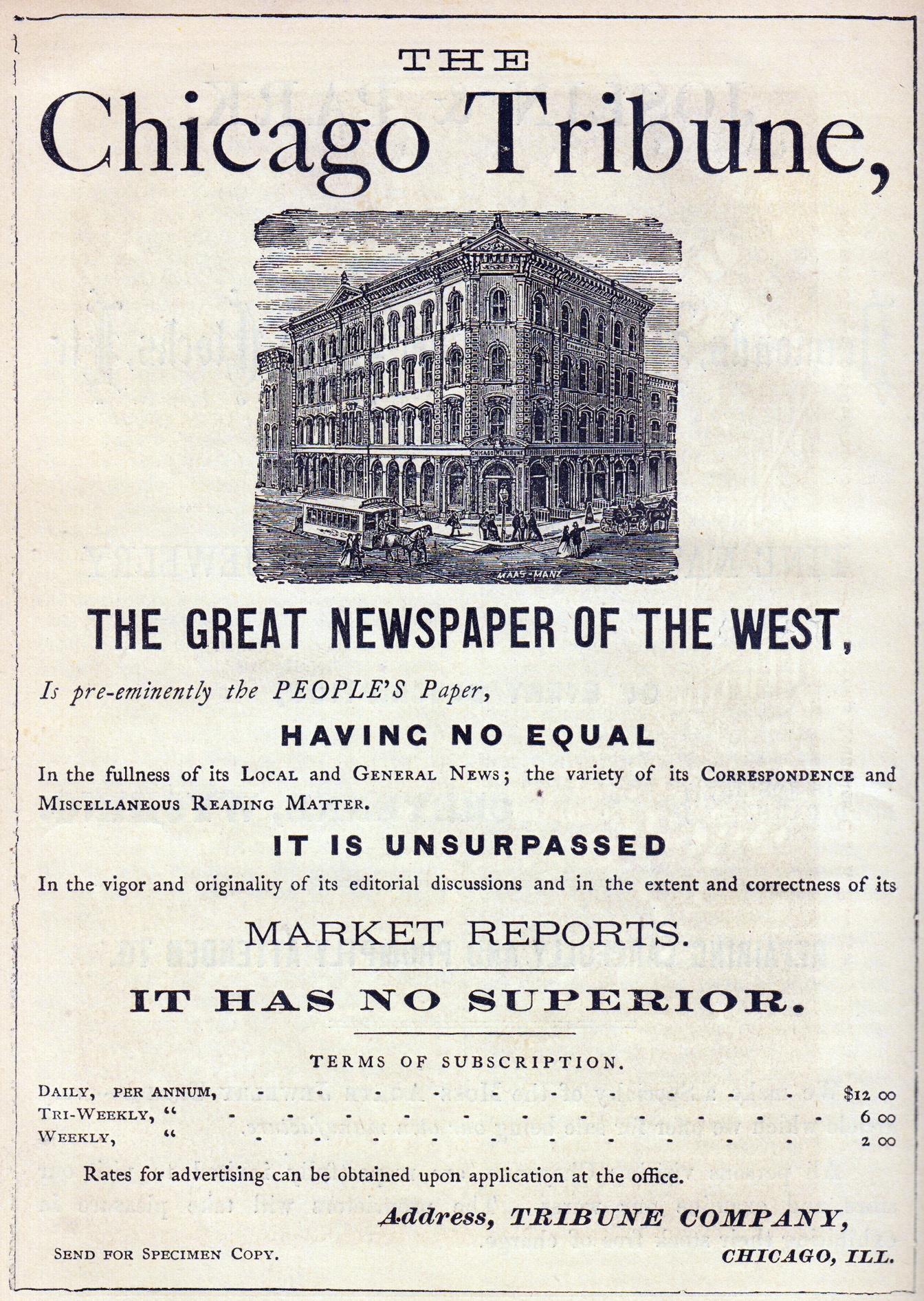
An 1870 advertisement for Chicago Tribune subscriptions

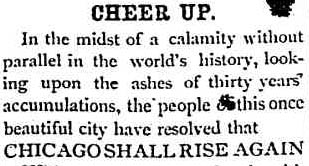
The lead editorial in the Chicago Tribune following the Great Chicago Fire

The Tribune was founded by James Kelly, John E. Wheeler, and Joseph K. C. Forrest, publishing the first edition on June 10, 1847. Numerous changes in ownership and editorship took place over the next eight years. Initially, the Tribune was not politically affiliated, but it tended to support either the Whig or Free Soil parties against the Democrats in elections. By late 1853, it was frequently running editorials that criticized foreigners and Roman Catholics. Around this time, it also became a strong proponent of the temperance movement. However nativist its editorials may have been, it was not until February 10, 1855, that the Tribune formally affiliated itself with the nativist American or Know Nothing Party, whose candidate Levi Boone was elected Mayor of Chicago the following month.

From 1853 to 1855, part-owner Capt. J. D. Webster, later General Webster and chief of staff at the Battle of Shiloh, and Charles H. Ray of Galena, Illinois, through Horace Greeley, convinced Joseph Medill of Cleveland's Leader to become managing editor. Ray became editor-in-chief, Medill became the managing editor, and Alfred Cowles, Sr., brother of Edwin Cowles, initially was the bookkeeper. Each purchased one third of the Tribune. Under their leadership, the Tribune distanced itself from the Know-Nothings, and became the main Chicago organ of the Republican Party. However, the paper continued to print anti-Catholic and anti-Irish editorials, in the wake of the massive famine immigration from Ireland.

The Tribune absorbed three other Chicago publications under the new editors: the Free West in 1855, the Chicago Democratic Press of William Bross in 1858, and the Chicago Democrat in 1861, whose editor, John Wentworth, left his position when elected as Mayor of Chicago. From 1858 to 1860, the paper was known as the Chicago Press & Tribune. On October 25, 1860, it became the Chicago Daily Tribune. Before and during the American Civil War, the new editors strongly supported Abraham Lincoln, whom Medill helped secure the presidency in 1860, and pushed an abolitionist agenda. The paper remained a force in Republican politics for years afterward.

In 1861, the Tribune published new lyrics by William W. Patton for the song "John Brown's Body". These rivaled the lyrics published two months later by Julia Ward Howe. Medill served as mayor of Chicago for one term after the Great Chicago Fire of 1871.

=== 20th century ===
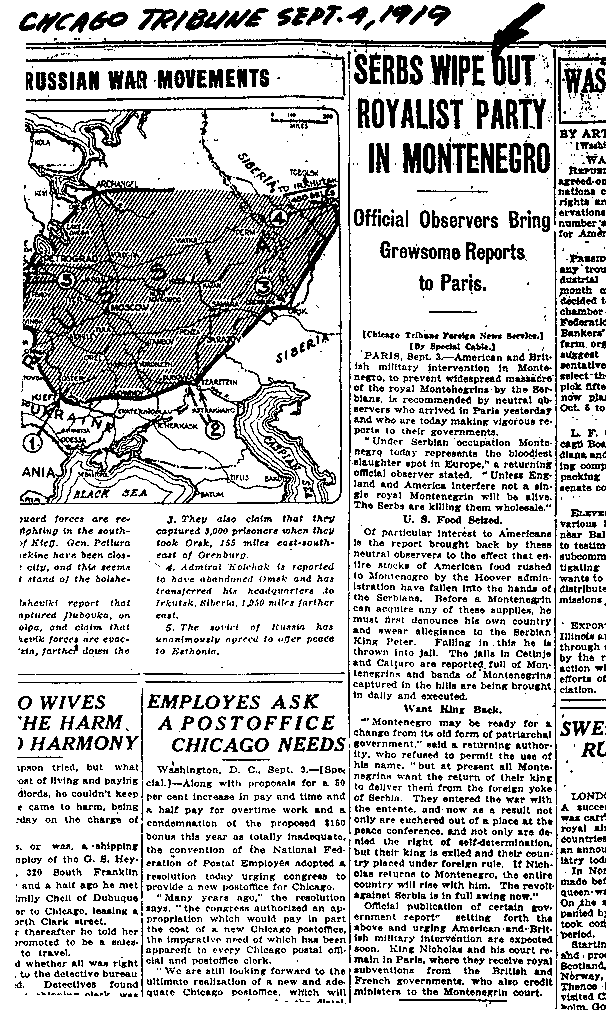
Tribune in 1919

In the 20th century, under Colonel Robert R. McCormick, who took control in the 1920s, the paper was strongly isolationist and aligned with the Old Right in its coverage of political news and social trends. It used the motto "The American Paper for Americans". From the 1930s–1950s, it excoriated the Democrats and the New Deal of Franklin D. Roosevelt, was resolutely disdainful of the British, and expressed support for Chiang Kai-shek and Sen. Joseph McCarthy.

When McCormick assumed the position of co-editor with his cousin Joseph Medill Patterson in 1910, the Tribune was the third-best-selling paper among Chicago's eight dailies, with a circulation of 188,000. The young cousins added features such as movie reviews by pioneering film critic Kitty Kelly, advice columns, and homegrown comic strips, such as Little Orphan Annie and Moon Mullins. They promoted political crusades, and their first success came with the ouster of the Republican political boss of Illinois, Sen. William Lorimer. At the same time, the Tribune competed with the Hearst paper, the Chicago Examiner, in a circulation war. By 1914, the cousins succeeded in forcing out James Keeley, the newspaper's managing editor. By 1918, the Examiner was forced to merge with the Chicago Herald.

In 1919, Patterson left the Tribune and moved to New York City to launch his own newspaper, the New York Daily News. In a renewed circulation war with Hearst's Herald-Examiner, McCormick and Hearst ran rival lotteries in 1922. The Tribune won the battle, adding 250,000 readers. The same year, the Chicago Tribune hosted an international design competition for its new headquarters, the Tribune Tower, offering a $50,000 prize for first place. The competition worked as a publicity stunt, and more than 260 entries were received. The winner was a neo-Gothic design by New York architects John Mead Howells and Raymond Hood. Construction of the Tribune Tower was completed in 1925.

In 1919, automobile magnate Henry Ford sued the Chicago Tribune and McCormick for libel after the Tribune called him an "anarchist" in an editorial. The Tribune's writer used the term in response to Ford's opposition to President Woodrow Wilson sending military forces to the Mexican border in 1916 and Ford calling soldiers "murderers". The trial lasted over the summer of 1919 and several prominent witnesses were called to testify, including generals and three history professors: Columbia University's William Archibald Dunning, Ohio State University's Francis Coker (who earned his Ph.D. under Dunning), and University of Michigan's Jesse Siddall Reeves. As expert witnesses, the three provided differing definitions of anarchism which, unlike Marxism, had no philosophical "father". In the end, Ford prevailed but the jury only awarded him six cents when he had asked for $1 million. According to University of New Mexico School of Law professor Joshua Kastenberg, the historians probably did not sway the jury, who were likely more enamored by the testimony of leading military figures and politicians.

The newspaper sponsored a pioneering attempt at Arctic aviation in 1929, a proposed round-trip to Europe across Greenland and Iceland in a Sikorsky amphibious aircraft. However, the aircraft was destroyed by ice on July 15, 1929, near Ungava Bay at the tip of Labrador, Canada. The crew were rescued by the Canadian science ship CSS Acadia.

The Tribune's reputation for innovation extended to radio. It bought an early station, WDAP, in 1924 and renamed it WGN, the station call letters standing for the paper's self-description as the "World's Greatest Newspaper". WGN Television was launched on April 5, 1948. These broadcast stations remained Tribune properties for nine decades and were among the oldest newspaper/broadcasting cross-ownerships in the country. (The Tribune's East Coast sibling, the New York Daily News, later established WPIX television and FM radio.)

The Tribune's legendary sports editor Arch Ward created the Major League Baseball All-Star Game in 1933 as part of the city's Century of Progress exposition.

One of the great scoops in Tribune history came when it obtained the text of the Treaty of Versailles in June 1919. Another was its revelation of U.S. war plans on the eve of the Pearl Harbor attack. The Tribune's June 7, 1942, front-page article implying that the U.S. had broken Japan's naval code could have resulted in the Japanese learning a closely guarded military secret. The story was not cleared by censors and had U.S. President Franklin D. Roosevelt so enraged that he considered shutting down the Tribune.

From 1940 to 1943, the paper supplemented its comic strip offerings with The Chicago Tribune Comic Book, responding to the new success of comic books. At the same time, it launched the more successful and longer-lasting The Spirit Section, which was also an attempt by newspapers to compete with the new medium.

Under McCormick's stewardship, the Tribune was a champion of modified spelling for simplicity. Beginning in 1934, the paper compiled lists of dozens of common words whose spelling could be made "saner", removing double L's and shortening "-ogue" endings to "-og", among other changes. In 1939, some of these alternative spellings were abandoned due to unpopularity, such as "crum" for "crumb" and "sherif" for "sheriff", while introducing more prominent changes, such as the words "altho", "tho", "thoro", and "thru", which would become distinctive features of the Tribune for decades. Most of these simplified spellings were kept until a stylebook update in 1975 adopted Webster's Third as the paper's authority on spelling, with an editorial concluding that "we do not want to make any more trouble between Johnny and his teacher." However, a few others, including "cigaret" and "dialog", were kept as late as 1981.

==== 1948 U.S. presidential election ====
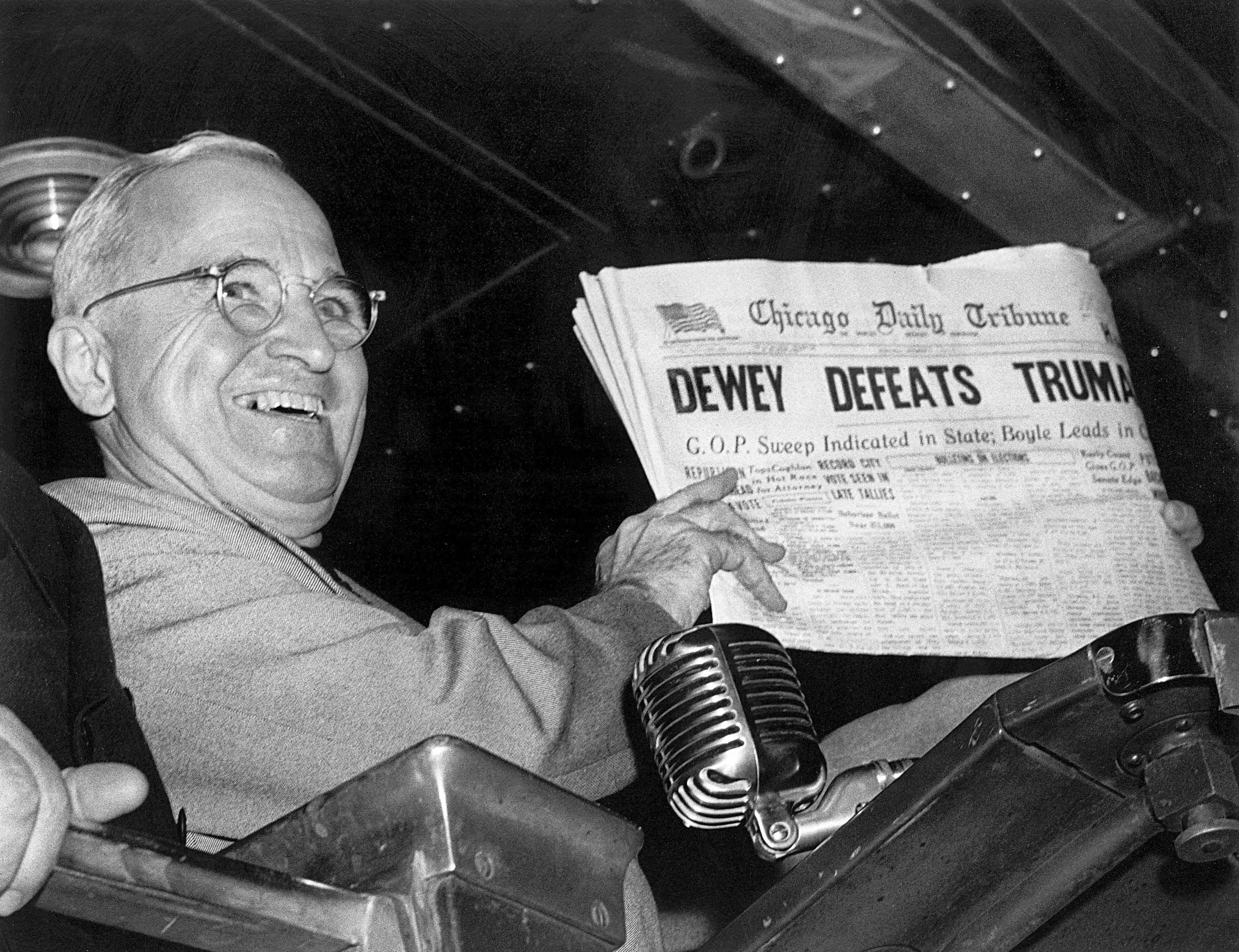
Truman was widely expected to lose the 1948 election, and the Chicago Tribune ran the incorrect headline, "Dewey Defeats Truman" in its early edition the day after the election.

The paper is known for a mistake it made during the 1948 presidential election. At the time, much of its composing room staff was on strike. Early returns led editors (along with many in the country) to believe that the Republican candidate Thomas Dewey would win. An early edition of the next day's paper carried the headline "Dewey Defeats Truman", turning the paper into a collector's item. Democrat Harry S. Truman won and proudly brandished the newspaper in a famous picture taken at St. Louis Union Station. Beneath the headline was a false article, written by Arthur Sears Henning, which purported to describe West Coast results, although written before East Coast election returns were available.

McCormick, a vigorous campaigner for the Republican Party, died in 1955, just four days before Democrat Richard J. Daley was elected mayor of Chicago for the first time.

In 1969, under the leadership of publisher Harold Grumhaus and editor Clayton Kirkpatrick, the Tribune began reporting from a wider viewpoint. The paper retained its Republican and conservative perspective in its editorials, but it started publishing wider commentary that represented a spectrum of diverse opinions, while its news reporting no longer had the conservative slant from the McCormick years. In January 1974, Time magazine named the Tribune on its "Ten Best American Dailies" list for its local investigative reporting under George Bliss as well as its "calmer tone and a less polemical approach to events" brought on by Kirkpatrick.

On May 1, 1974, in a major feat of journalism, the Tribune published the complete 246,000-word text of the Watergate tapes, in a 44-page supplement that hit the streets 24 hours after the transcripts' release by the Nixon White House. Not only was the Tribune the first newspaper to publish the transcripts, but it beat the U.S. Government Printing Office's published version, and made headlines doing so. A week later, after studying the transcripts, the paper's editorial board observed that "the high dedication to grand principles that Americans have a right to expect from a President is missing from the transcript record." The Tribune's editors concluded that "...things have reached such a state that Mr. Nixon’s departure, one way or another, is the best course for the Presidency, the country, and the free world", and called for Nixon's resignation. The Tribune's call made news, reflecting the change in the type of conservatism practiced by the paper, and a watershed event in terms of Nixon's hopes for survival in office.

On December 7, 1975, Kirkpatrick announced in a column that Rick Soll, a "young and talented columnist" for the paper, whose work had "won a following among many Tribune readers over the last two years", had resigned. Kirkpatrick did not identify the columnist but acknowledged that a column dating to November 23, 1975, contained verbatim passages written by another columnist in 1967 and later published in a collection. The paper initially suspended Soll for a month without pay. Kirkpatrick wrote that further evidence revealed that another of Soll's columns contained information which he knew was false. At that point, Tribune editors decided to accept the resignation offered by Soll when the internal investigation began. After leaving, Soll married Pam Zekman, a Chicago newspaper (and future TV) reporter. He worked for the short-lived Chicago Times magazine, by Small Newspaper Group Inc. of Kankakee, Illinois, in the late 1980s.

In January 1977, Tribune columnist Will Leonard died at age 64. In March 1978, the Tribune announced it had hired columnist Bob Greene from the Chicago Sun-Times.

==== 1980s–1990s ====
Kirkpatrick stepped down as editor in 1979 and was succeeded by Maxwell McCrohon, who served as editor until 1981. McCrohon was transitioned to a corporate position, which he held until 1983, when he left to become editor-in-chief of the United Press International. James Squires served as the paper's editor from 1981 to 1989. Jack Fuller served as the Tribune's editor from 1989 until 1993, when he became the president and CEO of Tribune Publishing. Howard Tyner served as the Tribune's editor from 1993 until 2001, when he was promoted to vice president/editorial for Tribune Publishing.

The Tribune won 11 Pulitzer prizes during the 1980s and 1990s. Editorial cartoonist Dick Locher won the award in 1983, and editorial cartoonist Jeff MacNelly won in 1985. Then, future editor Fuller won a Pulitzer for editorial writing in 1986. In 1987, reporters Jeff Lyon and Peter Gorner won a Pulitzer for explanatory reporting, and in 1988, Dean Baquet, William Gaines and Ann Marie Lipinski won a Pulitzer for investigative reporting. In 1989, Lois Wille won a Pulitzer for editorial writing, and Clarence Page won the award for commentary. In 1994, Ron Kotulak won a Pulitzer for explanatory journalism, while R. Bruce Dold won it for editorial writing. In 1998, reporter Paul Salopek won a Pulitzer for explanatory writing, and in 1999, architecture critic Blair Kamin won it for criticism.

In September 1981, baseball writer Jerome Holtzman was hired by the Tribune after a 38-year career at the Sun-Times.

In September 1982, the Chicago Tribune opened a new $180M printing facility, Freedom Center.

In November 1982, Tribune managing editor William H. "Bill" Jones, who had won a Pulitzer Prize in 1971, died at age 43 of cardiac arrest as a result of complications from leukemia.

In May 1983, Tribune columnist Aaron Gold died at age 45 of complications from leukemia. Gold had coauthored the Tribune's "Inc." column with Michael Sneed and prior to that had written the paper's "Tower Ticker" column.

The Tribune scored a coup in 1984 when it hired popular columnist Mike Royko away from the rival Sun-Times.

In 1986, the Tribune announced that film critic Gene Siskel, its best-known film writer, had shifted from being a full-time film critic to a freelance contract writer who was to write about the film industry for the Sunday paper and provide capsule film reviews for the paper's entertainment sections. The demotion came after Siskel and longtime Chicago film critic colleague Roger Ebert decided to shift production of their weekly movie review show, then known as At the Movies with Gene Siskel and Roger Ebert and later as Siskel & Ebert & The Movies, from Tribune Entertainment to The Walt Disney Company's Buena Vista Television unit. "He has done a great job for us," editor James Squires said at the time. "It's a question of how much a person can do physically. We think you need to be a newspaper person first, and Gene Siskel has always tried to do that. But there comes a point when a career is so big that you can't do that." Siskel declined to comment on the new arrangement, but Ebert publicly criticized Siskel's Tribune bosses for punishing Siskel for taking their TV program to a company other than Tribune Entertainment. Siskel remained as a freelancer until he died in 1999. He was replaced by film critic Dave Kehr.

In February 1988, Tribune foreign correspondent Jonathan Broder resigned after publishing his article from February 22 that contained a number of sentences and phrases taken, without attribution, from a column written by another writer, Joel Greenberg, that had been published 10 days earlier in The Jerusalem Post.

In August 1988, Chicago Tribune reporter Michael Coakley died at age 41 of complications from AIDS.

In November 1992, Tribune associate subject editor Searle "Ed" Hawley was arrested by Chicago police and charged with seven counts of aggravated criminal sexual abuse for allegedly having sex with three juveniles in his home in Evanston, Illinois. Hawley formally resigned from the paper in early 1993, and pleaded guilty in April 1993. He was sentenced to three years in prison.

In October 1993, the Tribune fired its longtime military affairs writer, retired Marine David Evans, saying publicly that the position was being replaced by a national security writer.

In December 1993, the Tribune's longtime Washington, D.C. bureau chief, Nicholas Horrock, was fired after he chose not to attend a meeting that editor Howard Tyner requested of him in Chicago. Horrock, who shortly thereafter left the paper, was replaced by James Warren, who attracted new attention to the Tribune's D.C. bureau through his continued attacks on celebrity broadcast journalists in Washington.

In December 1993, the Tribune hired Margaret Holt from the South Florida Sun-Sentinel as its assistant managing editor for sports, making her the first female to head a sports department at any of the nation's 10 largest newspapers. In mid-1995, Holt was replaced as sports editor by Tim Franklin and shifted to a newly created job, customer service editor.

In 1994, reporter Brenda You was fired by the Tribune after freelancing for supermarket tabloid newspapers and lending them photographs from the Tribune's photo library. She later worked for the National Enquirer and as a producer for The Jerry Springer Show before committing suicide in November 2005.

In April 1994, the Tribune's new TV critic, Ken Parish Perkins, wrote an article about then-WFLD morning news anchor Bob Sirott in which Perkins quoted Sirott as making a statement that he later denied making. Sirott criticized Perkins on the air, and the Tribune later printed a correction. Eight months later, Perkins stepped down as TV critic and left the paper shortly thereafter.

In December 1995, the alternative newsweekly Newcity published a first-person article by the pseudonymous Clara Hamon (a name mentioned in the play The Front Page). Tribune reporters identified the writer as former Tribune reporter Mary Hill. In the article, she criticized the paper's one-year residency program, which brought young journalists in and out of the paper for one-year stints, seldom resulting in a full-time job. Hill, who wrote for the paper from 1992 to 1993, told the Chicago Reader that she had written the diatribe originally for the Internet, and that the piece was eventually edited for Newcity.

In 1997, the Tribune celebrated its 150th anniversary in part by tapping longtime reporter Stevenson Swanson to edit the book Chicago Days: 150 Defining Moments in the Life of a Great City.

On April 29, 1997, popular columnist Mike Royko died of a brain aneurysm. On September 2, 1997, the Tribune promoted longtime City Hall reporter John Kass to take Royko's place as the paper's principal Page Two news columnist.

On June 1, 1997, the Tribune published what would become a very popular column by Mary Schmich called "Advice, like youth, probably just wasted on the young", otherwise known as "Wear Sunscreen" or the "Sunscreen Speech". A gift book was published in 1998. Another form of the essay is the music single released in 1999, accredited to Baz Luhrmann.

In 1998, reporter Jerry Thomas was fired by the Tribune after he wrote a cover article on boxing promoter Don King for Emerge magazine at the same time he was writing an article on King for the Tribune's Sunday magazine. The paper decided to fire Thomas—and suspend his photographer on the Emerge story, Pulitzer Prize-winning Tribune photographer Ovie Carter for a month—because Thomas did not tell the Tribune about his outside work and because the Emerge story appeared in print first.

On June 6, 1999, the Tribune published a first-person travel article from freelance writer Gaby Plattner that described a supposed incident in which a pilot for Air Zimbabwe, who was flying without a copilot, inadvertently locked himself out of his cockpit while the plane was flying on autopilot and as a result needed to use an ax to chop a hole in the cockpit door. An airline representative wrote a letter to the paper calling the account "totally untrue, unprofessional and damaging to our airline" and explained that Air Zimbabwe does not keep axes on its aircraft and never flies without a full crew. The paper was forced to print a correction stating that Plattner had "passed along a story she had heard as something she had experienced."

The Tribune was an early investor in America Online, buying a stake at 7 cents per share in 1991. It then launched such web sites as Chicagotribune.com (1995), Metromix.com (1996), ChicagoSports.com (1999), ChicagoBreakingNews.com (2008), and ChicagoNow (2009). In 2002, the paper launched a tabloid edition targeted at 18- to 34-year-olds known as RedEye.

=== 21st century ===
Ann Marie Lipinski was the paper's editor from February 2001 until stepping down on July 17, 2008. Gerould W. Kern was named the paper's editor in July 2008. In early August 2008, managing editor for news Hanke Gratteau resigned, and several weeks later, managing editor for features James Warren resigned as well. Both were replaced by Jane Hirt, who previously had been the editor of the Tribune's RedEye tabloid.

In June 2000, Times Mirror merged with Tribune Company, making The Baltimore Sun and its community papers Baltimore Sun Media Group/Patuxent Publishing a subsidiary of Tribune.

In July 2000, Tribune outdoors columnist John Husar, who had written about his need for a new liver transplant, died at age 63, just over a week after receiving part of a new liver from a live donor.

Tribune's Baltimore Community papers include Arbutus Times, Baltimore Messenger, Catonsville Times, Columbia Flier, Howard County Times, The Jeffersonian, Laurel Leader, Lifetimes, North County News, Northeast Booster, Northeast Reporter, Owings Mills Times, and Towson Times.

The Howard County Times was named 2010 Newspaper of the Year by the Suburban Newspaper Association.

The Towson Times expands coverage beyond the Towson area and includes Baltimore County government and politics.

The Tribune won five Pulitzer prizes in the first decade of the 21st century. Salopek won his second Pulitzer for the Tribune in 2001 for international reporting, and that same year the Tribune's explanatory reporting team won the honor for a profile of the chaotic U.S. air traffic system. In 2003, editorial writer Cornelia Grumman won the award for editorial writing. In 2005, Julia Keller won a Pulitzer for feature reporting on a tornado that struck Utica, Illinois. In 2008, the Tribune's investigative reporting team won the Pulitzer for its series about faulty government regulation of defective toys, cribs, and car seats.

In late 2001, sports columnist Michael Holley announced he was leaving the Tribune after just two months because he was homesick. He returned to The Boston Globe, where he had been working before joining the Tribune.

On September 15, 2002, Lipinski wrote a terse, page-one note informing readers that longtime columnist Bob Greene had resigned after acknowledging "engaging in inappropriate sexual conduct some years ago with a girl in her late teens whom he met in connection with his newspaper column." The conduct occurred in 1988 with a woman who was of the age of consent in Illinois. "Greene's behavior was a serious violation of Tribune ethics and standards for its journalists," Lipinski wrote. "We deeply regret the conduct, its effect on the young woman and the impact this disclosure has on the trust our readers placed in Greene and this newspaper."

In January 2003, Mike Downey, formerly of the Los Angeles Times, was hired as new Tribune sports columnist. He and colleague Rick Morrissey would write the In the Wake of the News Column originated by Ring Lardner.

In March 2004, the Tribune announced that freelance reporter Uli Schmetzer, who retired from the Tribune in 2002 after 16 years as a foreign correspondent, had fabricated the name and occupation of a person he had quoted in a story. The paper terminated Schmetzer as a contract reporter and began a review of the 300 stories he had written over the prior three years.

In May 2004, the Tribune revealed that freelance reporter Mark Falanga was unable to verify some facts in a lifestyle-related column that ran on April 18, 2004, about an expensive lunch at a Chicago restaurant—namely, that the restaurant charged $15 for a bottle of water and $35 for a pasta entree. "Upon questioning, the freelance writer indicated the column was based on an amalgam of three restaurants and could not verify the prices," the paper noted. After the correction, the Tribune stopped using Falanga.

In October 2004, Tribune editor Ann Marie Lipinski at the last minute spiked a story written for the paper's WomanNews section by freelance reporter Lisa Bertagnoli titled "You c_nt say that (or can you?)", about a noted vulgarism. The paper ordered every spare body to go to the Tribune's printing plant to pull already-printed WomanNews sections containing the story from the October 27 package of preprinted sections in the Tribune.

In September 2008, the Tribune considered hiring controversial sports columnist Jay Mariotti, shortly after his abrupt resignation from arch-rival the Chicago Sun-Times. Discussions ultimately ended, however, after the Sun-Times threatened to sue for violating Mariotti's noncompete agreement, which was to run until August 2009. Sports columnist Rick Morrissey defected to the Sun-Times in December 2009.

In April 2009, 55 Tribune reporters and editors signed their names to an e-mail sent to Kern and managing editor Jane Hirt, questioning why the newspaper's marketing department had solicited subscribers' opinions on stories before they were published, and suggesting that the practice raised ethical questions as well as legal and competitive issues. Reporters declined to speak on the record to the Associated Press (AP) about their issues. "We'll let the e-mail speak for itself," reporter John Chase told the AP. In the wake of the controversy, Kern abruptly discontinued the effort, which he described as "a brief market research project".

In the first decade of the 21st century, the Tribune had multiple rounds of reductions of staff through layoffs and buyouts as it has coped with the industry-wide declines in advertising revenues:

- In December 2005, the Tribune eliminated 28 editorial positions through a combination of buyouts and layoffs, including what were believed to be the first layoffs in the paper's history. Among the reporters who left the paper were Carol Kleiman, Bill Jauss, and Connie Lauerman.
- In June 2007, about 25 newsroom employees took buyouts, including well-known bylines like Charles Madigan, Michael Hirsley and Ronald Kotulak, along with noted photographer Pete Souza.
- In March 2008, the paper gave buyouts to about 25 newsroom employees, including sportswriter Sam Smith.
- On August 15, 2008, the Tribune laid-off more than 40 newsroom and other editorial employees, including reporters Rick Popely, Ray Quintanilla, Lew Freedman, Michael Martinez, and Robert Manor.
- Also in August 2008, about 36 editorial employees took voluntary buyouts or resigned, including well-known bylines like Michael Tackett, Ron Silverman, Timothy McNulty, Ed Sherman, Evan Osnos, Steve Franklin, Maurice Possley, Hanke Gratteau, Chuck Osgood, and Skip Myslenski.
- On November 12, 2008, five editorial employees in the paper's Washington, D.C. bureau were laid off, including John Crewdson.
- On December 4, 2008, about 11 newsroom employees were laid-off, with one sports columnist, Mike Downey, having departed several weeks earlier when his contract was not renewed. Well-known bylines who were laid off included Neil Milbert, Stevenson Swanson, Lisa Anderson, Phil Marty, Charles Storch, Courtney Flynn, and Deborah Horan.
- In February 2009, the Tribune laid off about 20 editorial employees, including several foreign correspondents, and some feature reporters and editors, although several, including Charles Leroux and Jeff Lyon, took buyouts. Among those who were let go were reporters Emily Nunn, Susan Chandler, Christine Spolar, and Joel Greenberg.
- On April 22, 2009, the paper laid off 53 newsroom employees, including well-known bylines like Patrick Reardon, Melissa Isaacson, Russell Working, Jo Napolitano, Susan Diesenhouse, Beth Botts, Lou Carlozo, Jessica Reaves, Tom Hundley, Alan Artner, Eric Benderoff, James P. Miller, Bob Sakamoto, Terry Bannon, and John Mullin. This was less than the 90 newsroom jobs that Crain's Chicago Business previously had reported were to be eliminated.

On May 29, 2009, the Tribune broke a story that several students had been admitted to the University of Illinois based on connections or recommendations by the school's Board of Trustees, Chicago politicians, and members of the Rod Blagojevich administration. Initially denying the existence of a so-called "Category I" admissions program, university President B. Joseph "Joe" White and Chancellor Richard Herman later admitted there were instances of preferential treatment. Although they claimed the list was short and their role was minor, the Tribune revealed emails through an FOIA finding that White had received a recommendation for a relative of convicted fundraiser Tony Rezko to be admitted. The Tribune also later posted emails from Herman pushing for under-qualified students to be accepted. The Tribune has since filed suit against the university administration under the Freedom of Information Act to acquire the names of students benefited by administrative clout and impropriety.

=== 2010s ===
For 2010, the Tribune shrank its newspaper's width by an inch, making its broadsheet pages 11 inches wide. It stated the new format was becoming the industry standard and that there would be minimal content changes. The paper had already trimmed the width by an inch in 2008.

In July 2011, the Chicago Tribune underwent its first round of layoffs of editorial employees in more than two years, letting go about 20 editors and reporters. This included DuPage County reporter Art Barnum, Editorial Board member Pat Widder, and photographer Dave Pierini.

On March 15, 2012, the Tribune laid off 15 editorial staffers, including security guard Wendell Smothers (who then died on November 12, 2012). At the same time, the paper gave buyouts to six editorial staffers, including Pulitzer Prize-winning reporter William Mullen, Barbara Mahany, and Nancy Reese.

In June 2012, the Tribune's Pulitzer Prize-winning cultural critic Julia Keller left the paper to join the faculty of Ohio University and to pursue a career as a novelist. In September 2012, Tribune education reporter Joel Hood resigned to become a real estate broker, City Hall reporter Kristen Mack left to become press secretary for Cook County Board President Toni Preckwinkle, and the Tribune hired Pulitzer Prize-winning photographer John J. Kim from the Chicago Sun-Times. In October 2012, the Tribune's science and medicine reporter, Trine Tsouderos, quit to join a public relations firm.

Also in October 2012, the Tribune announced plans to create a paywall for its website, offering digital-only subscriptions at $14.99 per month, starting on November 1, 2012. Seven-day print subscribers would continue to have unlimited online access at no additional charge.

In February 2013, the Tribune agreed to pay $660,000 to settle a class-action lawsuit that had been filed by 46 current and former reporters of the paper's local-news reporting group, TribLocal, over unpaid overtime wages. The suit was filed in federal court on behalf of Carolyn Rusin, who had been a TribLocal staff reporter from July 2010 until October 2011. The TribLocal unit was formed in 2007 and used staff reporters, freelance writers, and user-generated content to produce hyperlocal Chicago-area community news.

On June 12, 2013, the Boston Marathon bombing tribute was posted again, which showed the words "We are Chicago" above the names of Boston sports teams. On the graphic, the word "Bruins" was ripped off and a comment was added, "Yeah, not right now we're not", in reference to the 2013 Stanley Cup Finals, which pit the Chicago Blackhawks against the Boston Bruins. Gerould Kern tweeted later that the Tribune "still supports [Boston] after all you've been through. We regret any offense. Now let's play hockey."

On November 20, 2013, the Tribune laid off another 12 or so editorial staffers.

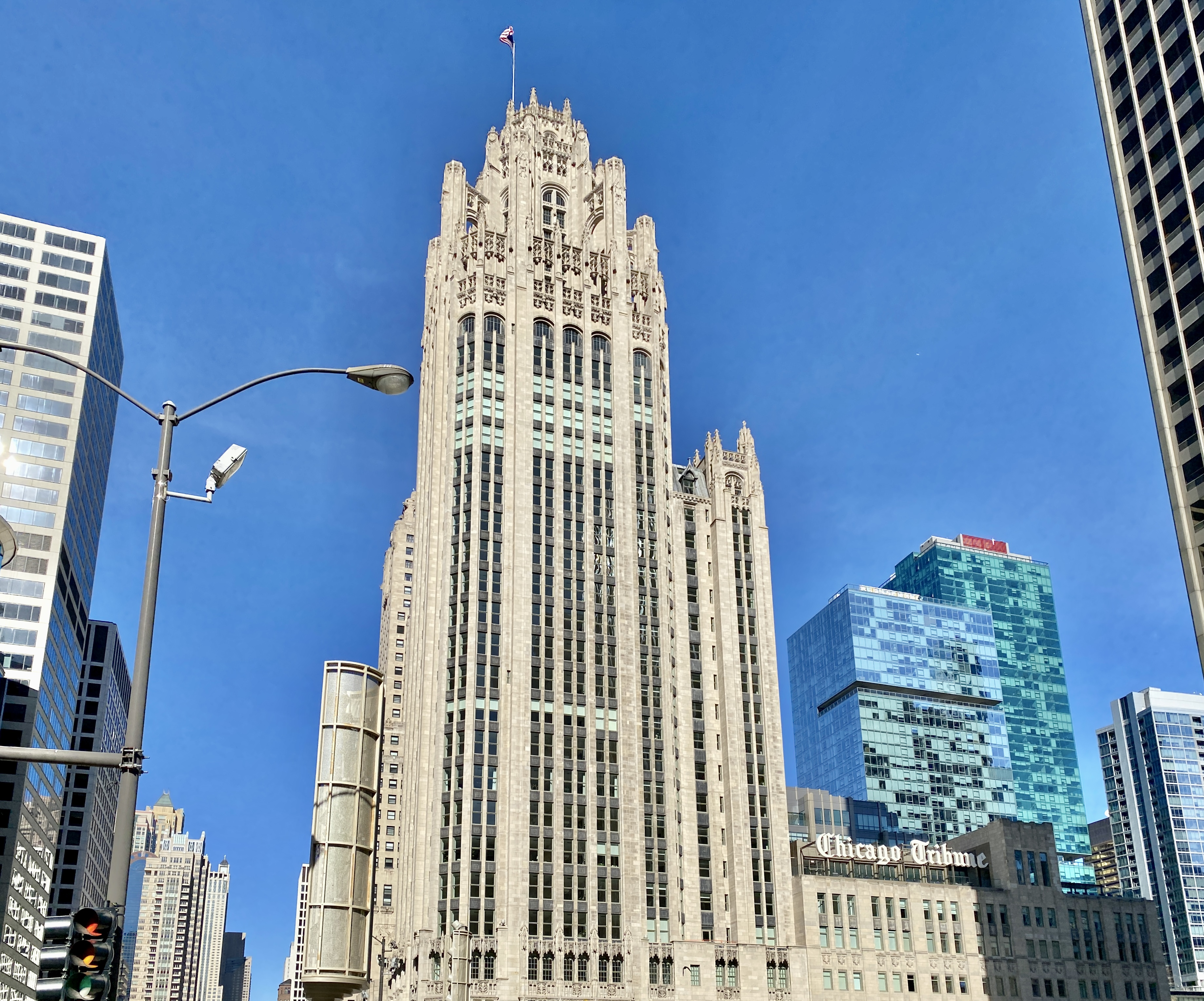
Tribune Tower, the newspaper's headquarters, opened in Chicago in 1925.

On April 6, 2014, the Tribune increased the newsstand price of its Sunday/Thanksgiving Day paper by 50% to $2.99 for one copy. The newsrack price increased $0.75, or 42.9%, to $2.50. By January 2016, the price increased again, by 33%, to $3.99 for the Sunday paper.

On January 28, 2015, metropolitan editor Peter Kendall was named managing editor, replacing Jane Hirt, who had resigned several months earlier. Colin McMahon was named associate editor.

On February 18, 2016, the Tribune announced the retirement of editor Gerould Kern and the immediate promotion of the paper's editorial page editor, R. Bruce Dold, to editor.

On June 9, 2018, the Tribune ended their 93-year stint at Tribune Tower and moved to One Prudential Plaza. The tower was later converted to condos.

=== 2020s ===
On February 27, 2020, the Tribune announced that publisher and editor Bruce Dold would leave the Tribune on April 30, 2020, and step down immediately as editor in chief. Colin McMahon replaced him as editor. Also, the paper announced that one of the two managing editors of the paper, Peter Kendall, would leave on February 28, 2020.

In January 2021, the Chicago Tribune moved out of One Prudential Plaza, and relocated their offices and newsroom to Freedom Center.

In May 2021, the paper was purchased by Alden Global Capital. Alden immediately launched a round of employee buyouts, reducing the newsroom staff by 25%, and the cuts continued. A former reporter said the paper was being "snuffed out, quarter after quarter after quarter". A report in The Atlantic said that Alden's business model is simple: "Gut the staff, sell the real estate, jack up subscription prices, and wring as much cash as possible out of the enterprise until eventually enough readers cancel their subscriptions that the paper folds, or is reduced to a desiccated husk of its former self."

Mitch Pugh was named the Tribune's executive editor on August 20, 2021, after eight years in the same role at The Post and Courier in Charleston, South Carolina.

== Editorial ==
=== Policy ===
In a 2007 statement of principles published in the Tribune's print and online editions, the paper's editorial board described the newspaper's philosophy, from which is excerpted the following:

The Chicago Tribune believes in the traditional principles of limited government; maximum individual responsibility; minimum restriction of personal liberty, opportunity and enterprise. It believes in free markets, free will and freedom of expression. These principles, while traditionally conservative, are guidelines and not reflexive dogmas.

The Tribune brings a Midwestern sensibility to public debate. It is suspicious of untested ideas.

The Tribune places great emphasis on the integrity of government and the private institutions that play a significant role in society. The newspaper does this in the belief that the people cannot consent to be governed unless they have knowledge of, and faith in, the leaders and operations of government. The Tribune embraces the diversity of people and perspectives in its community. It is dedicated to the future of the Chicago region.

The Tribune has remained economically conservative, being widely skeptical of increasing the minimum wage and entitlement spending. It criticized the George W. Bush administration's record on civil liberties, the environment, and many aspects of its foreign policy. However, it continued to support his presidency while taking Democrats, such as Illinois Governor Rod Blagojevich and Cook County Board President Todd Stroger, to task and calling for their removal from office.

In 2018, the Chicago Tribune and Los Angeles Times withdrew their websites from European Union nations to avoid the purview of the General Data Protection Regulation.

=== Election endorsements ===
In 2004, the Tribune endorsed President George W. Bush for reelection, a decision consistent with its longstanding support for the Republican Party. In 2008, it endorsed Democratic candidate and Illinois junior U.S. Senator Barack Obama—the first time that it had ever endorsed a Democrat for president. The Tribune endorsed Obama once again for reelection in 2012, and in 2020 would endorse another Democrat, Joe Biden, who had served as vice president under Obama. In 2024, it abstained from endorsement.

The Tribune has occasionally backed candidates of other parties for president. In 1872, it supported Horace Greeley, a former Republican Party newspaper editor. In 1912, the paper endorsed Theodore Roosevelt, who ran on the Progressive Party slate against Republican President William Howard Taft. In 2016, the Tribune endorsed the Libertarian Party candidate, former New Mexico Governor Gary Johnson, for president, over Republican Donald Trump and Democrat Hillary Clinton.

Even when it frequently backed Republicans for president, the Tribune endorsed some Democrats for lesser offices, including endorsements of Bill Foster for the House of Representatives, Barack Obama for the Senate, and Melissa Bean, who defeated Philip Crane, the House's longest-serving Republican. Although the Tribune endorsed George Ryan in the 1998 Illinois gubernatorial race, the paper subsequently investigated and reported on the scandals surrounding Ryan during his preceding years as Secretary of State. Ryan declined to run for re-election in 2002 and was subsequently indicted, convicted and imprisoned as a result of the scandal.

== Tribune Company ==
The Chicago Tribune was the founding business unit of Tribune Company (since renamed Tribune Media), which included many newspapers and television stations around the country. In Chicago, Tribune Media owned the WGN radio station (720 AM) and WGN-TV (Channel 9). Tribune Company also owned the Los Angeles Times—which displaced the Tribune as the company's largest property—and the Chicago Cubs baseball team. The Cubs were sold in 2009; the newspapers spun off in 2014 as Tribune Publishing.

Tribune Company owned the New York Daily News from its 1919 founding until its 1991 sale to British newspaper magnate Robert Maxwell. The founder of the News—Capt. Joseph Medill Patterson—was a grandson of Joseph Medill and a cousin of Tribune editor Robert McCormick. Both Patterson and McCormick were enthusiasts of simplified spelling, another hallmark of their papers for many years. In 2008, the Tribune Company sold the Long Island newspaper Newsday—founded in 1940 by Patterson's daughter (and Medill's great-granddaughter), Alicia Patterson—to Long Island cable TV company Cablevision.

From 1925 to 2018, the Chicago Tribune was housed in the Tribune Tower on North Michigan Avenue on the Magnificent Mile. The building is neo-Gothic in style, and the design was the winner of an international competition hosted by the Tribune. The Chicago Tribune moved in June 2018 to the Prudential Plaza office complex overlooking Millennium Park after Tribune Media sold Tribune Tower to developers. In 2021, Tribune Media moved the paper's newsroom and main office again, this time to its Freedom Center printing facility by the Chicago River.

=== Pulitzer Prizes ===
For years, Colonel McCormick prevented the Tribune from participating in the Pulitzer Prize competition. But it has won 29 of the awards over the years, including many for editorial writing.

The Tribune won its first post-McCormick Pulitzer in 1961, when Carey Orr won the award for editorial cartooning. Reporter George Bliss won a Pulitzer the following year for reporting, and reporter Bill Jones another in 1971 for reporting. A reporting team won the award in 1973, followed by reporter William Mullen and photographer Ovie Carter, who won a Pulitzer for international reporting in 1975. A local reporting team won the award in 1976, and architecture critic Paul Gapp won a Pulitzer in 1979. In 2022, Cecilia Reyes, Chicago Tribune, and Madison Hopkins, Better Government Association, won a Pulitzer Prize in local reporting for a piercing examination of the city's long history of failed building- and fire-safety code enforcement, which let scofflaw landlords commit violations that resulted in dozens of deaths. The Tribune won the Pulitzer Prize for local reporting on May 4, 2026, for its coverage of Operation Midway Blitz, the Trump administration's immigration enforcement mission in the Chicago area.

==== Current ====
- Chris Jones
- Clarence Page
- Nina Metz
- Laura Washington

==== Past ====
- William Armstrong
- Monroe Anderson
- Skip Bayless
- Claudia Cassidy
- Steve Chapman
- Steve Daley
- Amy Dickinson
- Mike Downey
- Dahleen Glanton
- Bob Greene
- David Haugh
- Vernon Jarrett
- Blair Kamin
- John Kass
- Hugh Keough
- Ann Landers
- Ring Lardner
- Charles Madigan
- Steve Neal
- Jack Mabley
- Michael Phillips
- Mike Royko
- Mary Schmich
- Gene Siskel
- Heidi Stevens
- Arch Ward
- Eric Zorn
- Rex Huppke

== Zell ownership and bankruptcy ==
In December 2007, the Tribune Company was bought out by Chicago real estate magnate Sam Zell in an $8.2 billion deal. Zell was the company's new chairman. A year after going private, following a $124M third-quarter loss, the Tribune Company filed for Chapter 11 bankruptcy protection on December 8, 2008. The company made its filing with the U.S. Bankruptcy Court for the District of Delaware, citing a debt of $13B and assets of $7.6B.

Sam Zell originally planned to turn the company into a private company through the creation of an ESOP (employee stock ownership plan) within the company, but due to poor management that existed prior to his ownership, this did not work out as well as he intended.

As part of its bankruptcy plan, owner Sam Zell intended to sell the Cubs to reduce debt. This sale has become linked to the corruption charges leading to the arrest of former Illinois Governor Rod Blagojevich on December 9, 2008. Specifically, Blagojevich was accused of exploiting the paper's financial trouble in an effort to have several editors fired.

In the bankruptcy, unsecured bondholders of Tribune Co. essentially claimed that ordinary Tribune shareholders participated in a "fraudulent transfer" of wealth.

The law firm Brown Rudnick, representing the Aurelius group of junior creditors, filed fraudulent transfer claims and fraud claims against 33,000 to 35,000 stockholders who bought Tribune stock. Prolonged due to these claims against former officers, directors, and every former stockholder of the Chicago Tribune Company, the Tribune's bankruptcy-related legal and professional fees of $500M were more than twice the usual amount for that size of company.

The Tribune Co. emerged from bankruptcy in January 2013, partially owned by private equity firms which had speculated on its distressed debt. The reorganized company's plan included selling off many of its assets.

== Tribune Publishing divestment ==
Tribune Publishing, owning the Chicago Tribune, Los Angeles Times, and eight other newspapers, was spun off as a separate publicly traded company in August 2014. The parent Tribune Company was renamed Tribune Media. Tribune Publishing started life with a $350M loan, $275M of which was paid as a dividend to Tribune Media. The publishing company was also due to lease its office space from Tribune Media for $30M per year through 2017.

Spinning off Tribune Publishing avoided the capital gains taxes that would accrue from selling those assets. The shares in Tribune Publishing were given tax-free to stakeholders in Tribune Media, the largest shareholder was Oaktree Capital Management with 18.5%. Tribune Media, retaining the non-newspaper broadcasting, entertainment, real estate, and other investments, also sold off some of the non-newspaper properties.

On February 7, 2018, Tribune Publishing Company agreed to sell the Los Angeles Times to billionaire biotech investor Patrick Soon-Shiong. The purchase, made through Soon-Shiong's Nant Capital investment fund, was valued at $500M, along with the assumption of $90M in pension liabilities. The deal, which also included the San Diego Union-Tribune and other assets, was finalized on June 16, 2018.

== See also ==
- Tribune Content Agency (formerly Chicago Tribune Syndicate)
- Chicago Tribune Silver Basketball
- Chicago Tribune Silver Football
