= Charles Madigan =

American educator (born 1949)

- Born: Charles M. Madigan; August 23, 1949 (age 77)
- Occupations: Educator, journalist
- Writing career
- Language: English

Charles M. Madigan (born August 23, 1949) is an American educator who has been an editor, journalist and columnist in Chicago, Illinois.

== Life ==
Madigan grew up in Altoona, Pennsylvania and attended Pennsylvania State University. He had his first professional newspaper job with the Altoona Mirror in 1966. From 1968 to 1970 he worked as local government reporter for the Harrisburg Patriot in Harrisburg, Pennsylvania. He worked for United Press International from 1970 to 1979, including two and a half years as correspondent from the Soviet Union during the Cold War.

Associated with the Chicago Tribune from 1979 until 2008, he was the Sunday Perspective editor and senior correspondent, and was the paper's national editor, Washington, DC news editor, projects editor, Atlanta correspondent, national correspondent and was the paper's first senior writer. In 2000 he was executive editor of Britannica.com, but returned to the Tribune in October. Madigan wrote the main story on the September 11, 2001 attacks for the September 12, 2001 editions of the Tribune.

In 2003 and 2004 Madigan was an instructor at the Medill School of Journalism of Northwestern University. He co-authored and collaborated on several books. He was the editor of Global Chicago and worked on a book about his family's history in the coal mines of Western Pennsylvania. He has three sons, Eamon, Brian and Conor. His wife, Linda, teaches special education.

In 2007 Madigan became the Presidential Writer in Residence at Roosevelt University in Chicago, teaching classes focused on journalism and politics in the university's Department of Communication. He appeared on C-SPAN in 2005 and 2010.

== Works ==
- Madigan, Charles (editor), Global Chicago (2004, University of Illinois Press) ISBN 0-252-02941-0
- Martinez, Arthur and Charles Madigan, The Hard Road to the Softer Side: Lessons from the Transformation of Sears (2001, Crown Business) ISBN 0-8129-2960-8
- Greenwald, Gerald and Charles Madigan, Lessons from the Heart of American Business: A Roadmap for Managers in the 21st Century (2001, Warner Books) ISBN 0-446-52544-8
- O'Shea, James and Charles Madigan, Dangerous Company: The Consulting Powerhouses and the Businesses They Save and Ruin (1997, Nicholas Brealey) ISBN 0-8129-2634-X
- Madigan, Charles (editor) -30-: The Collapse of the Great American Newspaper (2007) (ISBN 978-1566637428)
- Destiny Calling, How the People Elected Barack Obama (2009) (ISBN 978-1566637787)
