= Cornelia Grumman =

Cornelia Grumman is an American Pulitzer Prize–winning journalist. She is the director of the Early Education Program at the Robert R. McCormick Foundation in Chicago. From 2008 to 2012, she was the executive director of the First Five Years Fund (FFYF). The First Five Years Fund is an education initiative committed to improving the lives of at-risk children by leveraging cost-effective investments in early learning. A project of the Ounce of Prevention Fund, FFYF is supported by five major family foundations: the Buffett Early Childhood Fund, the Bill & Melinda Gates Foundation, the Irving Harris Foundation, the George Kaiser Family Foundation, and the Children's Initiative, a project of the J.B. and M.K. Pritzker Family Foundation.

== Education and early career ==
Grumman enrolled at Duke University in 1981 with hopes to pursue a career in hotel and restaurant management; she even attended a cooking school in Paris, France beforehand to prepare. However, after meeting professional journalists at Duke through the DeWitt Wallace Center's Visiting Media Fellows program, she decided to reorient her ambitions, and pursue journalism. She graduated from Duke University in 1985 with a Bachelor of Science degree in public policy.

After graduating, Grumman became a reporter for the Raleigh News & Observer. Her first major assignment was to take a Greyhound bus from one end of the state to the other and write about what she saw and whom she met. On this journey, she found herself impassioned by the types of stories that could not be found in press release, government reports or police blotters.

"I was hooked," she wrote in an autobiographical sketch for "Meet the Tribune Editorial Board," a section published in the December 30, 2002, Chicago Tribune. "I wanted to see more of the world and to understand the connection between individuals, particularly those with faint voices, and the government institutions designed to serve them."

In 1989, she worked in China as a stringer for The Washington Post, covering the student democracy movement that unfolded in Tienanmen Square. Grumman went on to earn her master's at Harvard University's John F. Kennedy School of Government. [duke piece] "The Kennedy School enhanced my journalism by teaching me the broader context of issues," she said in an interview.

By 1994, Grumman had returned to her home state of Illinois as a reporter for the Chicago Tribune. She concentrated on issues about education, juvenile justice, Illinois politics and the death penalty. In 2000, she joined the Tribune's editorial board.

== First Five Years Fund ==
The First Five Years Fund's goal is to expand high-quality early learning services to one million additional children from birth to age five, with half of that expansion serving infants, toddlers and their families.

Through public education, federal advocacy and coordinated outreach, the First Five Years Fund hopes to garner increased support for early learning activities that are:

- Integrated from birth to age five, with special focus on infants and toddlers;
- High-quality and comprehensive in scope; and
- Focused first on serving those children most at-risk

"Early learning is one of the smartest public investments that we can make. Children shouldn't be playing catch-up when they enter kindergarten, and yet so many do. This emphasis on early learning services for babies and toddlers is because by the time a child turns three, a majority of their brain growth has already occurred. If we want greater school success later and a better-skilled workforce, we need to ensure the proper development of our most at-risk children at these earliest ages. Our goal then, is to support high-quality learning programs, such as Early Head Start, followed by preschool, for these earliest learners so that even the most at-risk children arrive at kindergarten ready to learn." Cornelia Grumman, First Five Years Fund.

Grumman stepped down as the executive director of the First Five Years Fund in March, 2012.

== Personal ==
Today, Grumman is married to journalist James Warren (journalist), they have two sons, Blair and Eliot. They currently reside in the north side of Chicago.

== Awards ==
Grumman received a Pulitzer Prize in 2003 for her series of Chicago Tribune editorials "Restoring Justice," that she wrote on capital punishment. Her editorials called on government officials to improve procedures for eyewitness identifications, address serious inequities in death-sentence convictions related to race and geography, narrow the eligibility for death penalty and acknowledge the problems with executing the intellectually disabled, the mentally ill, and juvenile offenders. "With the authority to impose the death penalty comes a responsibility to get it right," she wrote in her October 3, 2002 editorial, "The Future of Capital Punishment." She fervently added, "Now's the time to get it right. Get it right or get rid of it."

In 2001, 2005 and 2006, Grumman also received Casey Medal for Meritorious Journalism for editorials on children and family issues. She received a 2001 Studs Terkel award for her coverage of disadvantaged communities and three Herman Kogan awards for editorials about the criminal justice system.
