= Aswan (horse) =

Arabian stallion

- Aswan as a young horse in Egypt
- Breed: Arabian
- Sire: Nazeer
- Grandsire: Mansour
- Dam: Yosreia
- Maternal grandsire: Sheikh El Arab
- Sex: Stallion
- Foaled: 1958
- Died: 1984 (aged 25–26)
- Country: Egypt
- Color: Grey
- Breeder: Egyptian Agricultural Organization
- Owner: Tersk Stud, Russia
- Last updated on: March 13, 2008.

Aswan (1958–1984), originally named Raafat in Egypt, was a highly influential grey Egyptian-bred Arabian stallion who stood at the Tersk Stud in Russia. Sired by Nazeer out of Yosreia, he was given as a gift to the Soviet Union by the Egyptian government in 1963, in return for Soviet help in building the Aswan Dam.

He sired 296 foals over 19 seasons, more than any other stallion at Tersk Stud. His offspring were exported all over the world. A life-size commemorative bronze statue of him stands at the entrance to the Tersk Stud.

Though classified as "Straight Egyptian," Aswan's maternal great-great grandsire, Sotamm, was a horse whose pedigree traced entirely to the horses purchased by Wilfrid and Lady Anne Blunt from the stud of Ali Pasha Sherif and imported to England. Sotamm was foaled in England and then sold to the Egyptian government by Lady Wentworth of the Crabbet Arabian Stud. In a near-similar manner, Sotamm's grandsire Mesaoud, imported from Egypt by the Blunts, also sold to Russia and stood at the Tersk Stud when it was privately owned by Count Sergei Aleksandrovich Stroganov and his brother-in-law Prince Aleksandr Grigorievich Shcherbatov.

== Pedigree ==
Gamil Manial (RAS)
Mansour (RAS)
Nafaa El Sahira (RAS)
Nazeer (RAS)
Kazmeen (RAS)
Bint Samiha (RAS)
Samiha (RAS)
*Aswan
Mansour (RAS)
Sheikh El Arab (RAS)
Bint Sabah (RAS)
Yosreia (RAS)
Ibn Rabdan (RAS)
Hind(RAS)
Bint Rustem (RAS)
