= Abu Farwa =

- Breed: Arabian
- Sire: Rabiyas
- Dam: Rissletta
- Sex: Stallion
- Foaled: 1940
- Color: Chestnut
- Breeder: W.K. Kellogg Institute

Abu Farwa (May 22, 1940 – July 27, 1972) was an Arabian stallion used in the W.K. Kellogg Institute horse breeding program at Cal Poly, Pomona.

== Life ==
Abu Farwa was foaled May 22, 1940. He was the best-known son of the Kellogg lead sire Rabiyas, whose bloodlines traces to the programs of the Crabbet Arabian Stud and Maynesoro Stud, known for producing several five-gaited horses. His dam was the mare *Rissletta, bred by Crabbet and imported from England. Abu Farwa was a chestnut with bold horse markings, today generally referred to as sabino.

== Influence ==
Abu Farwa's name meant "father of chestnuts" which turned out to be true; of his 278 foals, 220 were chestnuts and 38 were bays. He sired 134 colts and 144 fillies. 12 of his sons and 20 of his daughters produced National winners. One son, Koester, was a popular exhibition dressage horse, and a grandson, Kontiki, was a well-known Arabian racehorse.

== Pedigree ==
Astraled
Gulastra
Gulnare
Rahas
Sidi
Raad
Rijma
Rabiyas
Sidi
Rehal
Ramim
Rabiyat
Nasik
Rokhsa
Rokhama
Abu Farwa
Ibrahim
Skowronek
Jaskolka
Naseem
Daoud
Nasra
Nefisa
*Risseletta
Nasik
Fafeef
Riyala
Risslina
Berk
Rissla
Risala
