= Nazeer (horse) =

Arabian stallion from Egypt

- Breed: Arabian
- Sire: Mansour
- Grandsire: Gamil Manial
- Dam: Bint Samiha
- Maternal grandsire: Kazmeen
- Sex: Stallion
- Foaled: 1934
- Country: Egypt
- Color: Gray
- Breeder: Egyptian Agricultural Organization
- Owner: Egyptian Agricultural Organization
- Last updated on: March 18, 2008.

Nazeer (foaled 9 August 1934 in Egypt) was a gray Arabian stallion from Egypt. He was sired by Mansour out of Bint Samiha.

He sired many offspring, among the best-known were Aswan, Ansata Ibn Halima, Hadban Enzahi (1952), and Morafic.

His maternal great-grandsire, Sotamm, was a horse of bloodlines all tracing to the horses imported by Wilfrid and Lady Anne Blunt from stud of Ali Pasha Sherif. Sotamm was born in England, and then sold to the Egyptian government by Lady Wentworth of the Crabbet Arabian Stud.

== Pedigree ==
Sakhlawi II (RAS)
Gamil Manial (RAS)
Dalal (RAS)
Mansour (RAS)
Meanagi Sbeyli(RAS)
Nafaa El Sahira (RAS)
Nafaa El Kebira (RAS)
*Nazeer
Sotamm (RAS)
Kazmeen (RAS)
Kasima (RAS)
Bint Samiha (RAS)
Samhan (RAS)
Samiha (RAS)
Bint Hadba el Saghira (RAS)
