= Ansata =

Ansata (Latin for "handled") may refer to:

- Crux ansata, a Christian cross that is shaped like an ankh with a circular rather than oval or teardrop-shaped loop
- Tabula ansata, a tablet with dovetail handles
- Ansata Ibn Halima (1958–1980), Egyptian Arabian horse
- Battle of Ansata, a 1270 AD battle between the Solomonic and Zagwe dynasties

== See also ==
- Ansa (disambiguation)
