= Will Keith Kellogg =

American businessman (1860–1951)

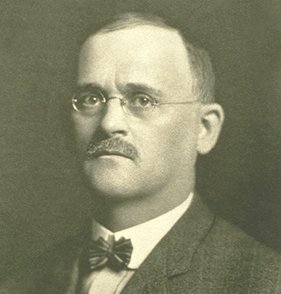
- Kellogg, circa 1900
- Born: William Keith Kellogg; April 7, 1860; Battle Creek, Michigan, U.S.
- Died: October 6, 1951 (aged 91); Battle Creek, Michigan, U.S.
- Resting place: Oak Hill Cemetery, Battle Creek
- Occupations: Industrialist, farmer
- Known for: Founder of Kellogg Company
- Spouses: Ella Davis (m. 1880) Carrie Staines Kellogg (m. 1918)
- Children: 5
- Relatives: John Harvey Kellogg (brother)

Will Keith Kellogg (born William Keith Kellogg; (Note: Kellogg legally changed his first name to Will when he was thirty-eight due to his dislike of the formal William and the nickname Willie, which he was called as a child.) April 7, 1860 – October 6, 1951) was an American industrialist in food manufacturing, who founded the Kellogg Company, which produces a wide variety of popular breakfast cereals. He was a member of the Seventh-day Adventist Church and practiced vegetarianism as a dietary principle taught by his church. He also founded the Kellogg Arabian Ranch, which breeds Arabian horses. Kellogg was a philanthropist and started the Kellogg Foundation in 1934 with a $66-million donation.

== Early career ==
As a young businessman, Kellogg started out selling brooms in his hometown of Battle Creek, Michigan. In December 1878, W.K. Kellogg was hired by George H. King at the urging of James Springer White, also known as Elder White, to help run his new broom factory in Dallas, Texas. W.K. returned home in November 1879 to help his brother John Harvey Kellogg manage the Battle Creek Sanitarium. The sanitarium, originally the Western Health Reform Institute, was part of a pioneering effort based on the health principles advocated by the Seventh-day Adventist Church. The Kellogg family are of paternal English descent which can be traced to three brothers Daniel, Joseph and Samuel, of Braintree, Essex, England, who emigrated to the Connecticut Colony in the 17th century.

John Kellogg described the Sanitarium system as "a composite physiologic method comprising hydrotherapy, phototherapy, thermotherapy, electrotherapy, mechanotherapy, dietetics, physical culture, cold-air cure, and health training".

The Kelloggs pioneered the process of making flaked cereal. Because of the commercial potential of the discovery, W.K. wanted it kept a secret. However, John allowed anyone in the sanitarium to observe the flaking process and one sanitarium guest, C. W. Post, copied the process to start his own company. That company became Post Cereals and, later, General Foods, the source of Post's first million dollars. That upset W.K. to the extent that he left the sanitarium to create his own company.

== Kellogg cereals ==
Together with his brother John, W.K. Kellogg promoted cereals, especially corn flakes (maize), as a healthy breakfast food. They started the Sanitas Food Company around 1897, focusing on the production of their whole-grain cereals. At the time, the standard breakfast for the well-off was eggs and meat, while the poor ate porridge, farina, gruel and other boiled grains. The brothers eventually argued over the addition of sugar to their product, with W.K. in favour of adding sugar and John opposed. In 1906, Will founded the Battle Creek Toasted Corn Flake Company, which later became the Kellogg Company.

In 1930, he established the W. K. Kellogg Foundation, ultimately donating $66 million to it. His company was one of the first to put nutrition labels on foods. He also offered the first inside-the-box prize for children. Kellogg said, "I will invest my money in people."

During the Great Depression, Kellogg directed his cereal plant to work four shifts, each lasting six hours. This gave more people in Battle Creek the opportunity to work during that time.

== Arabian horse breeder ==
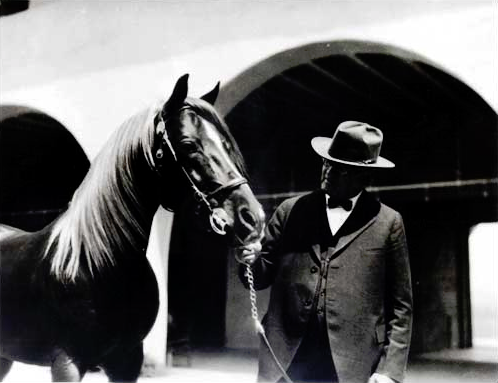
Kellogg and his Arabian horse Antez at Kellogg's former Arabian horse ranch (now Cal Poly Pomona)

Kellogg had a longtime interest in Arabian horses. In 1925, he purchased 377 acres (153 hectares) for $250,000 in Pomona, California, to establish an Arabian horse ranch. Starting with breeding stock descended from the imports of Homer Davenport and W. R. Brown, Kellogg then looked to England, where he purchased a significant number of horses from the Crabbet Arabian Stud, making multiple importations during the 1920s. The Kellogg ranch became well known in southern California not only for its horse breeding program but also for its entertaining, weekly horse exhibitions, open to the public and frequently visited by assorted Hollywood celebrities. Among many other connections to Hollywood, the actor Rudolph Valentino borrowed the Kellogg stallion "Jadaan" for his 1926 movie Son of the Sheik, along with a Kellogg employee, Carl Raswan, who rode in certain scenes as Valentino's stunt double.

In 1932, Kellogg donated the ranch, which had grown to 750 acres (304 hectares), to the University of California. In 1933, the ranch obtained some of the horses sold in the dispersal of Brown's Maynesboro stud. During World War II, the ranch was taken over by the U.S. War Department and was known as the Pomona Quartermaster Depot (Remount).

In 1948, the ranch was transferred to the U.S. Department of Agriculture; and in 1949, the land was deeded to the W. K. Kellogg Foundation. Later in 1949, title to the then 813-acre (329-hectare) ranch and horses was passed to the State of California, with the provision that the herd of Arabian horses must be maintained. The ranch became part of the Voorhis unit of what was then known as the California Polytechnic State College in Pomona. This became known as the Kellogg Campus, and in 1966, it was separated to form California State Polytechnic College, Kellogg-Voorhis.

The ranch was also the location of the W. K. Kellogg Airport (not to be confused with the airport of the same name in Battle Creek, Michigan). It operated from 1928 to 1932, and was then the largest privately owned airport in the country.

Some of Kellogg's property near Battle Creek was donated to Michigan State College and is now the Kellogg Biological Station.

== Death ==
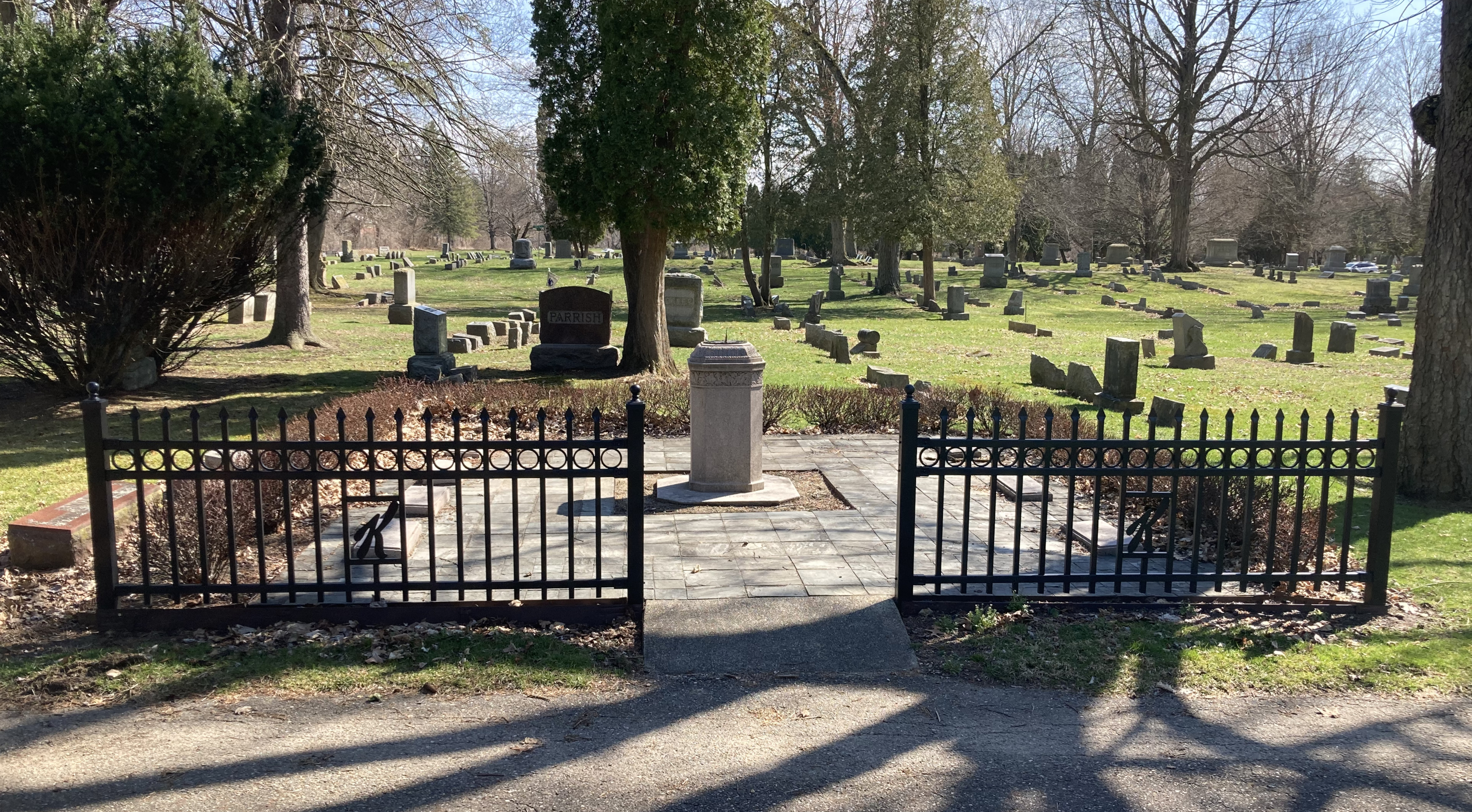
Kellogg's grave at Oak Hill Cemetery

Will Keith Kellogg died at the age of 91 in Battle Creek, Michigan, on October 6, 1951, of circulatory illness. He was buried there at Oak Hill Cemetery.

Kellogg outlived most of his children but was survived by two of them, Karl Hugh (d. 1955) and Elizabeth Ann (d. 1966), as well as grandsons Norman Williamson Jr. (d. 2001) and Will Keith Kellogg II (d. 2005).

== Philanthropy ==
The Kellogg Foundation quotes W.K. as follows:

It is my hope that the property that kind Providence has brought me may be helpful to many others, and that I may be found a faithful steward.

The philanthropy of W. K. Kellogg is recognized as instrumental to the founding of California State Polytechnic University, Pomona (Cal Poly Pomona) and Kellogg College, Oxford.

== In popular culture ==
Kellogg appears in "The Manual for Murder" (February 18, 2019), episode 16 of season 12 of the Canadian television period drama Murdoch Mysteries. Kellogg is played by actor Todd Thomas Dark.

== See also ==
- Cereal box prize
- Premium (marketing)

== Sources ==
- "W.K Kellogg Foundation".
- "Inventor of the Week: Archive". Lemelson-MIT Program. Archived from the original on March 10, 2005.
- "Will Keith Kellogg – People of Michigan". NSTATE, LLC.
- "100 Years: An Overview". Kellogg's Company. Archived from the original on November 2, 2006.
