= Mesaoud =

19th and 20th-century Arabian stallion

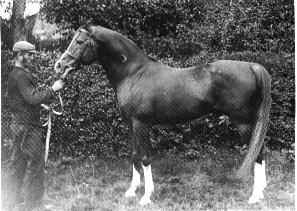
- Mesaoud at Crabbet Park
- Breed: Arabian
- Sire: Aziz
- Grandsire: Harkan
- Dam: Yamamah III
- Maternal grandsire: Shueyman
- Sex: Stallion
- Foaled: 1887
- Country: Egypt
- Color: Chestnut
- Breeder: Ali Pasha Sherif
- Owner: Crabbet Arabian Stud: Wilfred Scawen Blunt; Lady Anne Blunt
- Last updated on: January 21, 2008.

Mesaoud, an Arabian stallion, foaled 1887, was one of the foundation sires of the Crabbet Arabian Stud in England. Bred in Egypt by Ali Pasha Sherif, he was imported to England by Wilfred and Lady Anne Blunt in 1891. He belongs to the Saklawi bloodlineage, making him an Al Khamsa Arabian. His lineage can verifiably be traced to the Bedouin of the desert.

He was a chestnut stallion with brilliant white markings, noted for his correct conformation, good Arabian type and powerful build. His markings included a blaze, three full stockings with a right front partial stocking, and slight roaning to the body with scattered white spots on the body and on the head under the chin and jowl. The body white suggests that he had sabino genetics, and he is thought to be a primary source for that coloration when it appears in Arabians today.

== Background ==
The Blunts purchased Mesaoud in protracted negotiations with the aging Ali Pasha Sherif during 1888–1889. They finally completed the purchase of him as a two-year-old, along with the stallion Merzuk and the mare Khatila. In the two-year period before being shipped to England, he ran in the Cairo Eclipse Stakes at Ghezireh, which covered a distance of over a mile and a half. Victim of a bad start, he finished seventh out of ten horses.

In England, Mesaoud was used both as a riding horse and as a sire, with over 100 known purebred Arabian offspring recorded. He was also shown in 1896, 1897, and 1898 at the Crystal Palace Horse Show, taking first place each time. He was exhibited at the World Exhibition in Paris in 1900, alongside Arabians from around Europe.

== Legacy ==
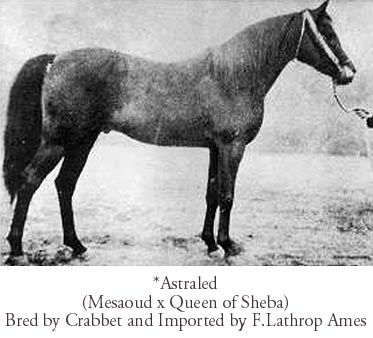
Astraled, the most famous son of Mesaoud, who was exported to the United States

Over time, his bloodline became a part of nearly every breedable mare at Crabbet, and thus he could not be used at the stud without the risk of inbreeding. Therefore, Mesaoud was eventually sold to Wladislas Kliniewski for 240 guineas in July 1903, and shortly thereafter was exported to Russia by Count Sergei Aleksandrovich Stroganov, where he lived for the remainder of his life at the site of the present day Tersk Stud. Mesaoud's exact fate is unknown, but it is believed that none of the Stroganov horses survived the Russian Revolution.

One of his most famous sons was Astraled, who sired a number of foals in England before being imported to the United States by Lothrop Ames of Massachusetts in 1909. Astraled was used in Oregon as a Remount sire for crossbred working horses. Astraled then went to live with W.R. Brown in 1923, where he sired his last foal crop, which included his best-known son, Gulastra.

One of Mesaoud's descendants, the mare Rissalma, was imported by the Tersk Stud of the former Soviet Union in 1936 and produced the famous Russian-bred stallion Priboj. His grandson, the Astraled son Sotamm, was sold to Egypt, thus returning the Mesaoud bloodline to its nation of origin. Sotamm's great-grandson Nazeer is one of the most famous horses in the "Egyptian" line of pedigrees. Nazeer's son Aswan was exported from Egypt to Tersk in 1963, thus reintroducing the bloodlines of Mesaoud to Russia from yet another source.

Mesaoud's descendants are found worldwide and he appears in the pedigree of over 90% of all Arabian horses in the world today.

== Pedigree ==
Pedigree of Mesaoud, chestnut stallion, 1887
Sire Aziz Ch. 1881	Harkan	Zobeyni	Barq
Sire Aziz Ch. 1881	Harkan	Zobeyni	Sununah
Sire Aziz Ch. 1881	Harkan	Harka	desertbred
Sire Aziz Ch. 1881	Harkan	Harka	desertbred
Sire Aziz Ch. 1881	Aziza	Samhan I	Al Qumiz
Sire Aziz Ch. 1881	Aziza	Samhan I	Udayha
Sire Aziz Ch. 1881	Aziza	Bint Faras Nakadan	Zobeyni
Sire Aziz Ch. 1881	Aziza	Bint Faras Nakadan	Faras Nakadan
Dam Yamamah III Gr. 1872	Shueyman	Jerboa	Gharran
Dam Yamamah III Gr. 1872	Shueyman	Jerboa	Hajlah
Dam Yamamah III Gr. 1872	Shueyman	Shueyma	desertbred
Dam Yamamah III Gr. 1872	Shueyman	Shueyma	Salimah
Dam Yamamah III Gr. 1872	Yamamah II	Zobeyni	Barq
Dam Yamamah III Gr. 1872	Yamamah II	Zobeyni	Sununah
Dam Yamamah III Gr. 1872	Yamamah II	Ghazieh	desertbred
Dam Yamamah III Gr. 1872	Yamamah II	Ghazieh	desertbred

== See also ==
- Arabian horse
- Crabbet Arabian Stud
- Lady Anne Blunt

== Sources ==
- Archer, Rosemary, Colin Pearson and Cecil Covey. The Crabbet Arabian Stud: Its History and Influence. Crabbet Organisation, 1978. ISBN 0-906382-13-0
- Edwards, Gladys Brown. The Arabian: War Horse to Show Horse. Arabian Horse Association of Southern California, Rich Publishing, Revised Collector's edition, 1973.
- Wentworth, Judith Anne Dorothea Blunt-Lytton. The Authentic Arabian Horse, 3rd ed. George Allen & Unwin Ltd., 1979.
