= Violet Dickson =

English botanist, writer, and Orientalist (1896–1991)

Hajjiyah Dame Violet Penelope Dickson, DBE (née Lucas-Calcraft; 3 September 1896 – 4 January 1991) was an English botanist, writer, and Orientalist. She was the wife of British colonial administrator H. R. P. Dickson. She lived in Kuwait for 61 years, half of them as a widow, and published several books on the country. She was a keen amateur botanist and had a plant, Horwoodia dicksoniae, named in her honour.

== Biography ==
Violet Penelope Lucas-Calcraft was born in Gautby, Lincolnshire, England. Her father was Neville Lucas-Calcraft, a land agent. The 1900 census shows the family were living in Moat House, Gautby: the house was owned by Robert Charles de Gray Vyner, for whom Violet's father worked.

She met her husband, Harold Dickson (1881 – 1959), in Marseilles, France, shortly after the end of World War I, where she was working in a bank. She travelled out to meet him in India, where he was stationed, and where they were married. Shortly afterwards he was posted to Iraq.

Harold Dickson served as British Political Agent in Bahrain from 1919–1920. He also served in Persia (present-day Iran). In 1929, he was appointed British Political Agent to Kuwait, and served in this role until 1936. He briefly held this role again in 1941.

Violet accompanied him on all these postings, and soon became fluent in Arabic. After his retirement from political service, Harold Dickson worked for the Kuwait Oil Company. She was a keen botanist and published a book on the flora of Bahrain and Kuwait in 1955. She regularly sent wild flower collections to the botanic gardens at Kew Gardens in London, and the desert plant that she introduced to science, Horwoodia dicksoniae (known as khuzama in Arabic), was named in her honour.

She wrote her autobiography, Forty Years in Kuwait, at the urging of Ian Fleming, author of the James Bond series of books. He had travelled to Kuwait in 1960 to research and write a book for the Kuwait Oil Company, and Dame Violet was one of the people he interviewed. Fleming's book, titled State of Excitement, was never published as the Kuwait Oil Company 'did not care for its tone'; Dickson's book appeared 11 years after Fleming first suggested she should write it.

As the wife of a British government figure, she was expected to assist her husband in his duties, primarily at social functions and by accompanying him on some of his travels across the region. As a result, she came to know many of the rulers and dignitaries of the region, including King Abdul Aziz ibn Saud of Saudi Arabia, (who on one occasion presented her with an oryx, which became a pet), King Faisal of Iraq, four Kuwaiti rulers and many tribal sheikhs. She also dealt frequently with Western diplomats. This contact continued after the death of her husband, as her knowledge of Kuwait and the feuds and rivalries among the kingdom's 600-strong royal family made her an indispensable resource for British ambassadors and visiting diplomats. In 1976 Violet's 80th birthday party was a notable event for the British expatriate community in Kuwait.

Violet Dickson had a son, diplomat Hanmer Yorke Warrington Saud ("Dickie") Dickson, MBE (died 2005), and a daughter, (Irene) Zahra Freeth (née Dickson), also an author on Middle Eastern topics.

== Honorific Title ==
Dame Violet was given the honorific title Umm Saud (Arabic: أم سعود meaning Mother of Saud), and was also known as Umm Kuwait (Mother of Kuwait). She was also given the honorific Hajjiyah, a term of respect meaning a female who has completed the Haj, the pilgrimage to Mecca. This is unusual, as non-Muslims are not allowed to perform the Haj.

== Honours ==
Dickson was made Member of the Order of the British Empire (MBE) in 1942, Commander of the Order of the British Empire (CBE) in 1964 and Dame Commander of the Order of the British Empire (DBE) in 1976. She was awarded the Lawrence of Arabia Memorial Medal awarded by the Royal Society for Asian Affairs, London (formerly the Royal Central Asian Society) in 1960, for her work among the Bedouin women of Arabia and her study of the flora and fauna of the desert.

== Death ==
The British Political Agency in Kuwait was based in a house that had been built in 1870 for a Kuwaiti merchant. The Dicksons moved into the house in 1929, and the building served as the British political agency until 1935. Harold Dickson continued to live there until his death in 1959, and Violet until the Iraqi invasion of Kuwait in 1990, when she was evacuated, unwillingly, to Britain. She intended to return to her home in Kuwait City, but died on 4 January 1991, aged 94.

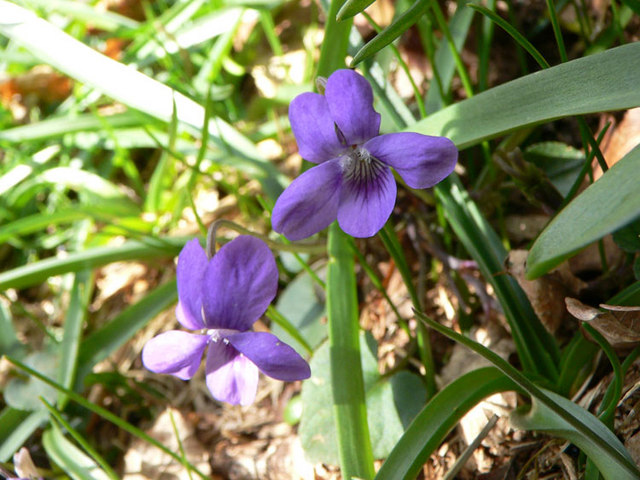

The house was ransacked during the invasion, but has since been restored by the Kuwaiti National Council for Culture, Arts and Letters, and is now a tourist attraction. It is one of few surviving examples of 19th-century Kuwaiti architecture, with thirty rooms on two floors.

== Eponymous scholarship ==
The British Council in Kuwait offers the Dame Violet Dickson Scholarship to Kuwaiti women to encourage them to continue their postgraduate studies in the UK. The scholarship is described as 'prestigious' and 'Kuwait's flagship award for women', reflecting the esteem in which Violet Dickson was held.

== Archive ==
Papers and photographs by Violet Dickson are held at the Middle East Centre Archive, St Antony's College, Oxford University. (MECA reference: GB165-0364). A gallery of photographs from the Violet Dickson Collection is available online here. Some papers are also held by the Faculty of Oriental Studies, Cambridge University, UK (FOS reference: BT C/22), and at Georgetown University Library, USA (William E. Mulligan papers).

== Works ==
- "A visit to Maskan and Auha Islands in the Persian Gulf off Kuwait, May 7th, 1942", Journal of the Bombay Natural History Society 43, pp. 258–264.
  (Reprinted in Ahmadi Newsletter, pp. 7, 5-12) (1942)
- The Wild Flowers of Kuwait and Bahrain London: George Allen & Unwin (1955), ASIN: B0000CJ4L3
- Forty Years in Kuwait London: George Allen & Unwin (1971), ISBN 978-0049200326
- Dickson wrote an introduction to Kuwait's Natural History: An Introduction (edited by David Clayton), Kuwait: Kuwait Oil Company (1983), ASIN: B000EMBMEW

== Other sources ==
- Al Rashoud, Claudia Farkas (1997) Dame Violet Dickson: "Umm Saud's" fascinating life in Kuwait from 1929-1990 Kuwait: al-Alfain Printing Press, ASIN: B0017R1BJ4
- Obituary, Oil and Gas Journal, Vol 89 (3), 21 January 1991
- Middle East Centre Archive, St Antony's College, Oxford University
- Interview with Dame Violet Dickson
- Official information about the Dickson House (scroll down the page)
- Account of a visit to the Dickson House in Kuwait
- Page on Horwoodia dicksoniae (many photographs; text in Arabic)
