= Zahra Freeth =

British author

Zahra Freeth (née Irene Zahra Dickson; 1924/1925 – 20 May 2015) was a British author who wrote primarily about the Middle East. She was the daughter of H. R. P. Dickson (died 1959) and Dame Violet Dickson (died 4 January 1991).

== Life ==
Zahra Dickson grew up in Kuwait. There, she and her family would spend time collecting animal and plant specimens for the Natural History Museum and Kew Gardens, discovering one plant and two insects that were previously unknown to science. One of the latter, a grasshopper, was named after Zahra: Utubius syriacus zahrae, now known simply as Utubius syriacus.

She later attended boarding schools in England, including Cheltenham Ladies College, and studied for her BA at Girton College, University of Cambridge. Her first book, Kuwait Was My Home, was published in 1956. She accompanied her husband, Richard Freeth, whom she married in 1951 to the bauxite mining town of Mackenzie, British Guiana (now Linden, Guyana) and wrote Run Softly, Demerara (1960) about her experiences there.

Her later writings were on Middle Eastern topics, including a children's book, Rashid of Saudi Arabia (2001). She lived in Essex. Her brother, Hanmer Yorke Warrington Sand ("Dickie") Dickson, MBE, who had served as H.M. Acting Commissioner in Anguilla, died in May 2005.

== Death ==
Zahra Freeth died on 20 May 2015, aged 90, after a short illness. Her obituary in the Girton College alumni magazine described her as "a respected author who wrote about Kuwait and Arabia in the days before the oil boom".

== Legacy ==
Freeth's writings are of use to modern-day anthropologists studying the change in Kuwaiti society. One such study commented that the "transformation of social values is clearly revealed in the history writings of Kuwait in the 1940s and 1950s, particularly in the work of Zahra Freeth, the daughter of a British diplomat who lived in Kuwait before and after the discovery of oil."

== Books by Zahra Freeth ==
- Kuwait Was My Home. London: Allen and Unwin (1956)
- Run Softly, Demerara. London: Allen and Unwin (1960)
- A New Look at Kuwait. London: Allen and Unwin (1972), ISBN 9780049530089
- Kuwait: Prospect and Reality. London: Allen and Unwin (1972) with H. V. F. Winstone
- Explorers of Arabia: From Renaissance to the End of the Victorian Era. London: Allen and Unwin (1978) edited by H. V. F. Winstone and Zahra Freeth
- "A Journey to Hail". Saudi Aramco World 31 (3) (May/June 1980) with H. V. F. Winstone
- The Arab of the Desert by H. R. P Dickson (1983), 3rd edition revised and abridged; edited by Robert Wilson and Zahra Freeth
- Rashid of Saudi Arabia. Lutterworth Press (2001) with Gordon Stowell, ISBN 9780718823900
- Zahra Freeth also wrote the introduction to Traditional Architecture in Kuwait and the Northern Gulf by Ronald Lewcock. London: Art and Archaeology Research Papers and The United Bank of Kuwait (1978)
