= Morafic =

- Breed: Arabian
- Sire: Nazeer
- Dam: Mabrouka
- Sex: Stallion
- Foaled: 1956
- Country: foaled Egypt, imported to United States
- Color: Gray
- Owner: Gleannloch Farms

Morafic (1956–1974) was a gray Arabian stallion foaled in Egypt and later imported to the United States by Gleannloch Farms. Morafic was sired by Nazeer and out of Mabrouka. Morafic sired 58 foals in Egypt and 151 in the US, of which 30 became US and Canadian National show winners. Morafic was the leading imported Egyptian sire of national winners during his lifetime.

== Pedigree ==
Pedigree of Morafic
Sire Nazeer	Mansour	Gamil Manial	Saklawi II
Sire Nazeer	Mansour	Gamil Manial	Dalal Al Zarka
Sire Nazeer	Mansour	Nafaa El Saghira	Sabbah I
Sire Nazeer	Mansour	Nafaa El Saghira	Nafaa El Kebira
Sire Nazeer	Bint Samiha	Kazmeen	Sotamm
Sire Nazeer	Bint Samiha	Kazmeen	Kasima
Sire Nazeer	Bint Samiha	Samiha	Samhan
Sire Nazeer	Bint Samiha	Samiha	Bint Hadba El Saghira
Dam Mabrouka	Sid Abouhom	El Deree	Saklawi Sheifi
Dam Mabrouka	Sid Abouhom	El Deree	Saklawiyah Shaifiya
Dam Mabrouka	Sid Abouhom	Layla	Ibn Rabdan
Dam Mabrouka	Sid Abouhom	Layla	Bint Sabah
Dam Mabrouka	Moniet El Nefous	Shahloul	Ibn Rabdan
Dam Mabrouka	Moniet El Nefous	Shahloul	Bint Radia
Dam Mabrouka	Moniet El Nefous	Wanisa	Sheikh El Arab
Dam Mabrouka	Moniet El Nefous	Wanisa	Medallela
