= Sheykh Obeyd =

Arabian horse stud farm near Cairo, Egypt

Sheykh Obeyd was a stud farm that raised Arabian horses, located near Cairo, Egypt. It was founded by Wilfred Blunt and Lady Anne Blunt in the late 19th century, and was the home of Lady Anne following her permanent separation from Wilfred in 1906.

The foundation bloodstock for Sheykh Obeyd came primarily from the breeding program of Ali Pasha Sherif, and some animals were sent on from Sheykh Obeyd to the Blunts' Crabbet Arabian Stud in England.

In 1901, a pack of foxhounds was shipped to Cairo to entertain British army officers and a fox hunt took place in the desert near Cairo. The fox was chased into Sheykh Obeyd, and the hounds and hunt followed it. The staff challenged the trespassers – who, though army officers, were not in uniform – and beat them when they refused to turn back. The staff were accused of assault against army officers and imprisoned. Wilfrid Blunt tried to free his staff, which caused embarrassment for of the British army officers and civil servants involved.
