= H. R. P. Dickson =

British colonial administrator (1881–1959)

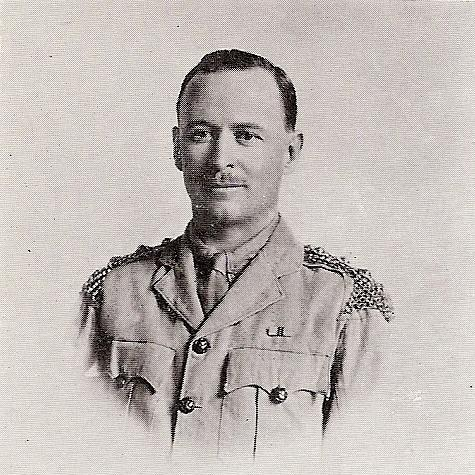
H. R. P. Dickson in Kuwait in 1919.

Lieutenant Colonel Harold Richard Patrick Dickson (4 February 1881 – 14 June 1959) was a British colonial administrator in the Middle East from the 1920s until the 1940s, and author of several books on Kuwait.

== Life ==
H. R. P. Dickson was one of six children of John Dickson, a diplomat in the Levant from 1872 to 1906, and Edith Wills. He was born in Beirut, Lebanon and was taken at a young age to Damascus, Syria where his father was Consul. There, his mother's milk failed and Shaikh Mijwal al Mazrab, the husband of Lady Jane Digby, provided the young child with a wet nurse from the 'Anizah tribe. Islamic law lays out the permanent family-like relationships that are created by wet nursing, and this "blood affinity" between Dickson and the 'Anizah meant he was treated as a member of the tribe. He stated that this blood tie 'in later life has been of assistance to me in my dealings with the Badawin [bedouin] of the high desert and around Kuwait'. Following the death of Lady Jane Digby, the Dickson family rented her house in Damascus, and Dickson recalled that he 'spent my childhood days rambling about the lovely garden that had once been [her] pride and happiness.'.

Dickson was educated at St Edward's School, Oxford and then attended Wadham College at Oxford University, where he was a university candidate in the Volunteer battalion of the Oxfordshire Light Infantry. He joined the 1st Connaught Rangers as a second lieutenant on 28 January 1903, serving in Ireland until 1904 and then in India, first with the 2nd Battalion Connaught Rangers and then in the 29th Lancers of the Indian Army. In the First World War he served in Mesopotamia before being transferred to the Political Department.

Dickson met his wife Dame Violet Dickson née Lucas-Calcraft (1896–1991) in Marseille, France, shortly after the end of World War I, where she was working in a bank. She travelled out to meet him in India, where he was stationed and where they were married. Shortly afterwards he was posted to Iraq.

Dickson served as British Political Agent in Bahrain from 1919 to 1920. In late January to late February 1920 Dickson visited Ibn Saud in Hasa in what is now Saudi Arabia. Around the same time he wrote a report on the Ikhwan movement. He also served in Persia (present-day Iran). In 1929 he was appointed British Political Agent to Kuwait, and served in this role until 1936. He briefly held this role again in 1941.

Some of his reports have been published in Political Diaries of the Arab World: Persian Gulf 1904-1965. The publishers' description of this volume reads in part: "Perhaps the most idiosyncratic [contributor to the volume] was Lt. Col. H. R. P. Dickson who wrote voluminously in the 1920s and 1930s on his trips into the Saudi hinterland, his meetings with rulers and all the machinations and gossip that sometimes go into political intelligence-gathering."

After retiring from his political career he worked for the Kuwait Oil Company, for which company he had been the first Chief Local Representative in Kuwait.

Dickson had a detailed knowledge of northern Gulf Arab life and customs, and produced two books which are considered valuable chronicles of a now-threatened way of life. These books, The Arab of the Desert: A Glimpse into Badawin Life in Kuwait and Sa'udi Arabia, first published in 1949, and Kuwait and her Neighbours, first published in 1956, have been described as 'monumental', and are now sought-after collector's items.

Dickson had a son, diplomat Hanmer Yorke Warrington Saud ("Dickie") Dickson, MBE (who died in May 2005), and a daughter (Irene) Zahra Freeth (née Dickson, died on 20 May 2015 after a short illness), who was also an author on Middle Eastern topics and who co-edited and abridged the third edition of The Arab of the Desert.

== The Dickson House Cultural Centre, Kuwait City ==
The British Political Agency in Kuwait was based in a house that had been built in 1870 for a Kuwaiti merchant. The Dicksons moved into the house in 1929, and the building served as the British political agency until 1935. Dickson lived there until his death in 1959, and Dame Violet until the Iraqi invasion of Kuwait in 1990, when she was evacuated to Britain. Dame Violet died before the liberation of Kuwait. The house was ransacked during the invasion, but has since been restored by the Kuwaiti National Council for Culture, Arts and Letters, and is now a tourist attraction. It is one of the few surviving examples of nineteenth century Kuwaiti architecture, with thirty rooms on two floors.

== H. R. P. Dickson archive ==
Papers by and relating to H. R. P. Dickson are held at the Middle East Centre Archive, St Antony's College, Oxford University (MECA reference: GB165-0085).

The Catalogue for the Harold Dickson Collection.

A few papers are held by the Faculty of Oriental Studies, Cambridge University (FOS reference: BT C/8 and BT C/22).

== Books and articles by H. R. P. Dickson ==
- "Migration and methods of bird snaring in North East Arabia" Journal of the Bombay Natural History Society 40, 740-744 (1939)
- The Arab of the Desert: A Glimpse into Badawin Life in Kuwait and Sa'udi Arabia London: George Allen & Unwin (1949)
- Kuwait and her Neighbours London: George Allen & Unwin (1956)
- "The tent and its furnishing" in Peoples and Cultures of the Middle East (Editor: A. Shiloh) New York: Random House (1969) 136-156

== Other sources ==
- Dickson, Violet (1971) Forty Years in Kuwait London: George Allen & Unwin
- Jennings, M. C., (1989) "Kuwait 50 years ago: Colonel H. R. P. Dickson's Game Register" Phoenix 6, 4-5
- Al Rashoud, Claudia Farkas (1997) Dame Violet Dickson: "Umm Saud's" fascinating life in Kuwait from 1929 to 1990 Kuwait: al-Alfain Printing Press
- Obituary of Dame Violet Dickson in Oil and Gas Journal, Vol 89(3), Jan 21, 1991
- Middle East Centre Archive, St Antony's College, Oxford University
- Interview with Dame Violet Dickson
- Article about Zahra Dickson Freeth, mentioning H. R. P. and Dame Violet Dickson
- Official information about the Dickson House (scroll down the page)
- Account of a visit to the Dickson House in Kuwait
