= Serafix =

Arabian stallion

- Serafix
- Breed: Arabian
- Sex: Stallion
- Foaled: 1949
- Country: born England, imported to United States
- Color: Chestnut
- Breeder: Crabbet Arabian Stud
- Owner: John Rogers

Serafix (1949–1973) was a purebred Arabian stallion, who was imported to California in 1954 by John Rogers from the Crabbet Arabian Stud in England. Serafix was a chestnut with a blaze, two white socks and a near half-sock. He also was noted for his bold demeanor, charismatic behavior, and excellent movement.

He had a successful show record in England, and after his arrival in America, Serafix was shown twice in 1954, and placed reserve champion in both shows. In 1955 he was grand champion and champion stallion at Pomona, California. In 1957 and '58 he was shown once each year and won champion stallion both years.

Rogers only stood Serafix to his own mares for many years, only opening his book to the public in 1971, two years before the horse's death.
