= Horwoodia =

Scientific classification
- Kingdom: Plantae
- Clade: Tracheophytes
- Clade: Angiosperms
- Clade: Eudicots
- Clade: Rosids
- Order: Brassicales
- Family: Brassicaceae
- Tribe: Isatideae
- Genus: Horwoodia; Turrill
- Species: H. dickisonae

Binomial name
- Horwoodia dickisonae Turrill

Synonyms
- Malcolmia musili Velen.; Tchihatchewia dicksoniae (Turrill) V.I.Dorof.

Genus of flowering plants

Horwoodia is a genus of flowering plants in the family Brassicaceae. It includes a single species, Horwoodia dicksoniae, an herbaceous annual native to desert regions of Iraq, Jordan, Kuwait, and Saudi Arabia in the northern Arabian Peninsula. The plant is branched from the base, growing 10 to 43 cm tall from a taproot. It has fragrant leaves. It typically grows in sandy desert soils, and occasionally in loose silty soil with stones, in open depressions and wadi beds.

The genus was erected by the English botanist William Bertram Turrill in 1939. The generic name honours Arthur Reginald Horwood, while the specific epithet acknowledges Violet Dickson, for their efforts in collecting specimens from the Arabian Peninsula.
