= Arthur Reginald Horwood =

British botanist and lichenologist (1879–1937)

- Born: May 29, 1879; Leicester, England
- Died: February 21, 1937
- Known for: Founding the Lichen Exchange Club; county and popular floras
- Scientific career
- Fields: Botany, lichenology
- Institutions: Leicester Museum; Royal Botanic Gardens, Kew
- Author abbrev. (botany): Horw.

Arthur Reginald Horwood (29 May 1879 – 21 February 1937) was a British botanist and lichenologist. He worked at Leicester Museum in the early part of his career and later served as a botanist at the herbarium of the Royal Botanic Gardens, Kew.

== Life and work ==
Horwood was born in Leicester on 29 May 1879. He trained for the Indian Civil Service but did not pass the medical examination, and in 1902 took up a post at Leicester Museum. He later became sub-curator there and resigned in 1922. In 1924 he was appointed temporary botanist at the Royal Botanic Gardens, Kew, remaining at the herbarium until his death on 21 February 1937. An obituary in Nature described his main botanical work as centred on fossil plants and the flora of Europe and the Near East, and noted that at Kew he worked in the European and Oriental Department, where he was largely occupied with naming plant collections from Persia (now Iran), Iraq, and other countries in the region.

In lichenology, Horwood founded the Lichen Exchange Club, which operated from 1907 to 1914, and in 1913 issued A Handlist of the Lichens of Great Britain, Ireland, and the Channel Islands for the club. He also contributed an account of the lichens of Leicestershire (1907) to the Victoria History of the Counties of England. Horwood wrote widely for both specialist and general audiences; among the popular works credited to him were Plant Life in the British Isles (three volumes, 1914–1916) and The Outdoor Botanist (1920). His most substantial publication was The Flora of Leicester and Rutland (1933), written with the third Earl of Gainsborough and drawing on extensive local surveys undertaken during his Leicester Museum years.

== Legacy ==
Horwood's herbarium was later acquired by the Welsh National Herbarium (now Amgueddfa Cymru – Museum Wales) as part of its lichen and fungi holdings.

The flowering plant genus Horwoodia was named in Horwood's honour by William Bertram Turrill in 1939. It is monotypic, and was based on Kuwaiti specimens collected by Horwood, which he believed represented a new genus and species (Horwoodia dicksoniae).
