= Dora Maclean =

Australian horse-breeder (1892–1978)

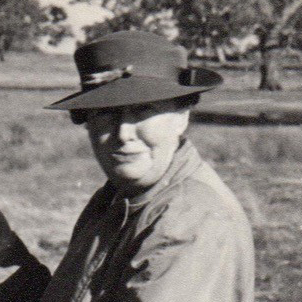
- in the 1940s
- Born: April 12, 1892; Fitzroy North
- Died: September 14, 1978 (aged 86); Toorak, Victoria
- Occupation: horse breeder
- Spouse: Alexander David Dick Maclean
- Children: three

Dora Maclean (12 April 1892 – 14 September 1978) was an Australian pedigree horse-breeder known for her Arabian horses. During the war she was obliged to employ women from the Australian Women's Land Army. She only employed women after that.

== Life ==
Maclean was born in 1892 in the Melbourne suburb of Fitzroy North. Her parents had arrived in Australia three years before. She was educated at the local Presbyterian Ladies' College but she chose her father's farm at Yan Yean for recreation where he bred large Clydesdale horses. In 1918, her father died and she and her sister, Eve, inherited the farm. For five years they bred sheep until 1923 when both Eve and her mother died.

She went to Europe where she used her knowledge of horses to buy examples of purebred Arabian horses and of Shetland ponies. She was said to be able to spot a good horse when it was still a foal. She had been interested in Arabian horses after seeing a photo of an Arabian mare owned by Wilfred and Lady Anne Blunt. (Lady Blunt's mum was Ada Lovelace). The Blunts had begun breeding Arabian horses in 1878.

While she was in Britain she purchased her first Arabian horse from Lady Blunt's daughter, Lady Wentworth, and it arrived in Australia in 1924/5. The Crabbet horse was called "Rafina" and it arrived with a colt. She imported more horses from the Crabbett line because of its pedigree. Her business led to her exporting horses around the world where the Fenwick name was also valued.

In 1931, the Australian Pony Stud Book Society was established and she was a founding member. In 1935, she imported two more Crabbett Arab horses Indian Light and Nisirich in order that she could breed better horses for polo and hunting.

The staff on the Maclean's farm were mostly men but during the war there was a loss of staff. Staff were found from the Australian Women's Land Army and this was very successful. After the war when the men returned, the farm continued to employ women.

In 1961, Cecil Covey sold the Fenwick stallion, Sindh, to Maclean.

== Death and legacy ==
Maclean died in 1978 in the Melbourne suburb of Toorak.
