= Ansata Ibn Halima =

Arabian horse

Ansata Ibn Halima++
- Breed: Arabian
- Sire: Nazeer
- Grandsire: Mansour
- Dam: Halima
- Maternal grandsire: Sheikh El Arab
- Sex: Stallion
- Foaled: 1958
- Country: Egypt
- Color: Gray
- Breeder: Egyptian Agricultural Organization
- Owner: Donald and Judith Forbis

Honors
- Legion of Merit winner US National Top Ten Stallion 1966, 1967, 1969; Region VI Park Champion
- Last updated on: March 13, 2008.

Ansata Ibn Halima (foaled 1958 in Egypt, died 1980) was a famous Arabian horse of Egyptian bloodlines who was imported from Egypt to the United States in 1959. A gray stallion, he was originally bred by the Egyptian Agricultural Organization (EAO), and imported by Donald and Judith Forbis of the Ansata Arabian Stud. He was a U.S. Top Ten Stallion in 1966, 1967, and 1969, as well as a sire of champion horses.

== Pedigree ==
Gamil Manial (RAS)
Mansour (RAS)
Nafaa El Sahira (RAS)
Nazeer (RAS)
Kazmeen (RAS)
Bint Samiha (RAS)
Samiha (RAS)
*Ansata Ibn Halima
Mansour (RAS)
Sheikh El Arab (RAS)
Bint Sabah (RAS)
Halima (RAS)
Ibn Rabdan (RAS)
Ragia (RAS)
Farida (RAS)
