= Crabbet Arabian Stud =

English horse breeding farm

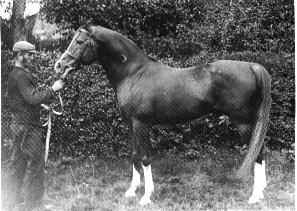
Mesaoud, one of the foundation sires of the Crabbet Arabian Stud, bred in Egypt by Ali Pasha Sherif, imported to England by the Blunts in 1891

The Crabbet Arabian Stud, also known as the Crabbet Park Stud, was an English horse breeding farm that ran from 1878 to 1972 in Pound Hill, Crawley, West Sussex.

== Founding ==
Its founder owners, husband and wife Wilfrid Scawen Blunt and Lady Anne Blunt, decided while travelling in the Middle East to import some of the best Arabian horses to England and breed them there. They also maintained the Sheykh Obeyd estate near Cairo, which facilitated this. Their daughter, Judith Blunt-Lytton, 16th Baroness Wentworth, carried on the stud until her death.

The stud was sold up in 1971, but its bloodlines continue to influence the breed worldwide in the 21st century.

== Travels in the Middle East ==
The Blunts' Arabian journeys are described in Bedouin Tribes of the Euphrates and A Pilgrimage to Nejd, based on Anne's journals, though heavily edited by Wilfrid. In the winter of 1877/1878 they left Aleppo for what is now Iraq and reached the camps of Faris, a prince of the Anazzah tribe; Ferhan and other Bedouin leaders. On a subsequent trip in 1881 the couple reached the heart of the Najd in what is now Saudi Arabia.

Among the horses the Blunts acquired on these journeys were the bay filly Dajania, purchased on Christmas Day in 1877; a dark bay mare eventually named Queen of Sheba, purchased from the Sheykh of Gomussa and his cousin in the summer of 1878; and a chestnut mare named Rodania. All three have left many descendants. Through their connections among the tribes, the Blunts also heard of a celebrated grey stallion. They sent a trusted friend, Zeyd Saad el Muteyri, to buy him; the horse was named Azrek, and became an influential sire.

The collection of Egyptian leader Abbas Pasha proved an equally valuable source of horses for Crabbet Stud. This Governor of Egypt acquired horses from Arabia and Syria; his stock formed the foundation for the stud of Ali Pasha Sherif. The Blunts made their initial visit to Ali Pasha Sherif in 1880 and purchased the stallion Mesaoud, in 1889. Lady Anne wrote: "He is four white legged and high up to the knee but surprisingly handsome."

As he aged, Ali Pasha Sherif's health failed and he encountered financial and political problems, leading to the ruin of his stud. In 1896 and 1897 Lady Anne inspected what she called the "sad remnants" before they were sold at auction, and was able to procure several of the best horses that remained. Some of these horses remained in Egypt, at a stud farm owned by the Blunts called Sheykh Obeyd. According to breed expert Rosemary Archer, some of today's horses of Crabbet breeding carry a higher proportion of Abbas Pasha blood than many present-day Egyptian Arabian horses.

Thanks to these purchases, Crabbet became a principal centre of Arabian horse breeding in England.

== Problems at Crabbet Stud ==
The Blunts spent much of their time travelling and in their absence the pastures were ill-tended, the stables and paddocks not cleaned, and stallions were shut up without exercise for weeks at a time.

Wilfrid Blunt had no experience of horse breeding and believed that Arabians should live in "desert conditions" that is, with little food or shelter provided. Lady Anne disagreed, was not able to demonstrate her methods of horse management until the Blunts separated in 1906. That year, the Stud was divided. Lady Anne signed a deed of partition drawn up by Wilfrid. Under its terms, she kept Crabbet Park and half the horses, while he took Caxtons Farm, also known as Newbuildings, and the rest of the stock. Soon afterwards, Lady Anne retired to Sheykh Obeyd, where she lived for most of the remainder of her life.

When Lady Anne died in 1917, the Crabbet estate went to her granddaughters, as did the horses she still owned in England. Judith had already purchased back some animals that Wilfred had sold to third parties and thus had a small herd of her own. Wilfrid attempted to seize the horses and land, including those already legally owned by his daughter. The mare Bukra, too near foaling to travel, was shot on Wilfred's orders. Wilfrid was in financial difficulties and sold 37 horses, exporting several to W.R. Brown's Maynesboro stud in the United States. Between thefts and sales of horses at Newbuildings, many horses of the original breeding program were lost to Crabbet.

Judith and her children forcibly took back her favorite mare, Riyala, from Wilfrid's stable, and purchased back many horses from their new owners.

A protracted lawsuit ensued between Wilfred and both his granddaughters' trustee and his daughter. At one point, after Wilfred had shot seven more horses, the trustee obtained an injunction to prevent the sale or destruction of any more animals.

In 1921, the court declared that Wilfrid's seizure of horses was illegal, and that even the deed of partition was invalid, having been signed by Lady Anne "under duress". Judith was able to buy out her daughters' share in the estate from the trustee. Upon Wilfrid's death in 1922, Judith bought Caxtons Farm from her father's executors and reunited the entire stud.

== Crabbet under Lady Wentworth ==
By the time Judith had become Lady Wentworth and taken over the Stud, Crabbet Park had been leased. The Stud retained eight horse boxes, some cowsheds and a few weedy pastures. The horses had been neglected, some had starved to death, and others took years to recover.

Lady Wentworth spent many years carefully rebuilding her stock and refining her breeding practices. To raise funds, she sold some bloodstock back to Egypt in 1920, including the stallions Kasmeyn, Sotamm, and Hamran, as well as the mares Bint Riyala and Bint Rissala. She also sold a number of horses to Spain's Duke of Veragua, including five Skowronek daughters.

In 1925 the Crabbet Stud was visited by Annie Henrietta Yule (1874-1950) and her only child Gladys Meryl Yule (1903-1957). They were extremely wealthy women from an Anglo-Indian merchant family, and on settling in England had decided to turn their home at Hanstead Park into an Arabian stud farm. A long relationship of buying and leasing horses followed; sometimes the studs were adversaries and sometimes partners. A third stud, Courtlands, was also held up to be of the same level, and the three competed against each other at annual shows such as the one at the Roehampton Club.

In 1926, the Kellogg Arabian Ranch in California, owned by breakfast cereal magnate W. K. Kellogg, spent over $80,000 to purchase a number of Crabbet horses, providing much needed money to the Stud.

=== Skowronek ===
Skowronek as a young horse

Lady Wentworth rejected Wilfred's "desert conditions" theory as well as a prevailing conviction that Arabians were naturally the size of large ponies (that is, under 14.2 hands (58 inches, 147 cm)). She first proved that Arabians could produce taller horses from the progeny of Rijm, a grandson of Rodania, who reached 16.1 hands (65 inches, 165 cm). Her great contribution to Arabian breeding, however, was her outcross of the Blunt bloodstock to Skowronek.

Lady Wentworth knew that she needed additional horses to outcross on descendants of her parents' original bloodstock. She added the chestnut stallion Dargee, and her most famous purchase, the gray stallion Skowronek.

The English painter Walter Winans bought Skowronek from Count Josef Potocki's Antoniny Stud in Poland, where he had been foaled in 1909. Winans rode the stallion and used him as a model for several bronzes, then sold him to Webb Wares, who used him as a hack, and eventually sold him to H. V. Musgrave Clark, where he was shown and used at stud for the first time, and seen by Lady Wentworth. She bought Skowronek in confusing circumstances. Clark believed he was selling the horse to an American exporter, but at the last minute, the export was cancelled and Lady Wentworth became the owner of Skowronek. Clark was a rival Arabian breeder, so deception may have been used to ensure that Crabbet could buy the horse from him. Clark was not happy about the result of the sale.

The gray became a spectacular stallion and was named "Horse of the Century". Lady Wentworth later turned down an offer of $250,000 from the Tersk Stud, and bragged that she once received a cable "from the Antipodes" addressed to "Skowronek, England." The outcross of the Crabbet stock with Skowronek was extremely successful, and the resulting animals sold throughout England and were exported to Argentina, Australia, Canada, Chile, Denmark, Egypt, France, Germany, Israel, the Netherlands, New Zealand, Pakistan, Poland, South Africa, Spain, Russia and the USA.

==== The Skowronek controversy ====
Lady Wentworth was satisfied that Skowronek was a purebred (or asil) Arabian, tracing his pedigree and strain to several reliable desert sources. In the General Stud Book, however, Skowronek's pedigree ends with three grandparents. This has led some Arabian enthusiasts to question if Skowronek was in fact a purebred. His sire, Ibrahim, was desert-bred and imported to Poland. His dam Jaskoulka (variously known as Yascolka or Yaskolka) was a Polish-bred Arabian. However, while the Poles had bred Arabians for centuries and kept careful pedigree records, they also crossed Arabian stallions on Thoroughbred and other non-Arabian mares. In addition, some breeders used different terminology to distinguish horses bred in the desert and imported to Poland from the descendants of those horses bred in Poland, with translation issues leading some English language researchers to argue that second and third generation Polish-bred purebred Arabians were not actually purebred. For these reasons, some people argued that his dam was not asil.

Research of Jaskoulka's pedigree shows that her sire Rymnik and her dam Epopeja (also spelled Epopeia or Epopya) both traced to Abbas Pasha horses. Nonetheless, due to this controversy, some private breeders' organizations, such as Al Khamsa, exclude descendants of Skowronek.

=== The Depression, World War II, and the postwar years ===
Crabbet's peak year was 1929, when over 30 mares were bred. But as the Great Depression deepened, it affected Crabbet Park, with Lady Wentworth only breeding 8 foals in 1932, and 2 foals in 1933. To reduce the size of the herd, she made major sales in 1936 to the Tersk Stud of the Soviet Union, selling 25 horses, including the beautiful Skowronek son Naseem. The stud's financial picture also improved by selling 3 more horses to the Kellogg Ranch. In this period, Lady Wentworth also sold horses to Australia, Brazil, Holland and Portugal. Nonetheless, the Depression years resulted in the birth of many fine horses, including Sharima, Indian Gold, Indian Crown, and Sharfina.

During World War II, Lady Wentworth's aunt, Mary Lovelace, died, leaving a large fortune. This inheritance meant the end of the financial problems for Lady Wentworth and the Crabbet Stud. In the war years, Lady Wentworth cut back her herd due to shortages and the necessity for the Stud to be completely self-supporting in horse feedstuffs. Despite this, horses such as Grey Royal, Silver Gilt, Indian Magic, Silfina, and Serafina were produced.

Crabbet was bombed during the war, with over 32 incendiaries dropped, but all landed on farmland and no humans or horses were injured. A Canadian Army Supply Unit took over part of the stud, with soldiers billeted in the house and even in some of the horse boxes.

After the war, Lady Wentworth purchased the stallions Raktha and Oran, and produced other significant breeding stock including Sharima, Silver Fire, Indian Gold, and Nisreen. By the time of her death in 1957 at the age of 84, she owned 75 horses, noted for their height, excellent movement and regal carriage.

== Crabbet under Cecil Covey ==
Lady Wentworth died on 8 August 1957. She left the Stud to its manager, Geoffrey Covey, but as he predeceased her by a few days it passed to his son Cecil. Cecil Covey sold some other land and nearly half of the 75 horses to pay the 80% inheritance tax owed. This sale was the largest single consignment of Arabians ever made from England, to Bazy Tankersley's Al Marah Stud in the USA.

In 1961 Covey also sold the stallion Sindh to Dora Maclean of Fenwick Stud in Australia, where he became one of Australia's most important Arabian sires.

For twelve years the stud ran smoothly, with twenty to thirty horses plus visiting mares; for the first time, the Crabbet sires were open to outside breeders.

In early 1970, Covey learned that the government planned to build the M23 motorway connecting South London with Gatwick Airport and Brighton. The motorway eventually bisected Crabbet Park, and, having lost most of the horse pastures to development, in 1972 Covey reluctantly sold off the last of the Stud.

== The legacy of Crabbet ==
Serafix, bred by Lady Wentworth, foaled 1949, imported to the United States in 1954, was one of the best-known of the "modern Crabbet" stallions, the result of over 60 years of Crabbet breeding. In this photo, he was 22 years old.

=== Horses ===
At least 90% of all Arabian horses alive today trace their pedigrees in one or more lines to Crabbet horses such as Mesaoud and Skowronek.

Many major Arabian sires worldwide show a strong Crabbet influence in their bloodlines:

- Polish and Russian bloodlines have a Crabbet influence through the Skowronek son and Mesaoud grandson Naseem, and his son Negatiw (or Negativ). Mesaoud was sold to Russia in 1903.
- Spanish bloodlines have a Crabbet influence through the stallion Nana Sahib and others.
- Even major historic "Egyptian-bred" sires such as Nazeer trace to Mesaoud through his Crabbet-bred grandson, Sotamm.
- The Crabbet-owned stallion Raktha, sire of Serafix, was exported to South Africa in 1951, along with several other Crabbet horses.
- The first Crabbet stallion imported to Australia was Rafyk, who was imported, along with two Crabbet mares, in 1891. Today, Australia has a significant number of "pure" Crabbet lines, undiluted by infusions from other sources, with possibly the highest percentage of straight-and high-percentage Crabbet blood in the world.
- A small number of Arabian horse breeders continue to produce preservation or "straight" Crabbet bloodlines, with all animals produced descending in every line from horses bred or purchased by the Crabbet stud. An even smaller group of breeders maintain preservation bloodlines tracing strictly to the horses imported or bred by the Blunts.

For the average Arabian horse owner, horses with Crabbet ancestry are noted for athletic ability, attractive appearance, and good dispositions. They are popular in under saddle classes and seen in many equestrian disciplines, both those limited to Arabians and those open to all breeds. The particular virtues of Crabbet horses—sound, athletic conformation, good movement, solid temperament and performance ability—show up especially well in under saddle competition, and particularly in the Arabian-dominated field of endurance riding, highlighted by 100-mile competitions such as the Tevis Cup in the USA and the Australian Quilty 100-Mile Endurance Ride. Crabbet breeding is also popular in the "Sport Horse" disciplines such as Dressage and show jumping, for which the Arabian Horse Association now sponsors a National Championship.

=== Property ===
Today the western half of Crabbet Park and Burleys Wood, a largely intervening wood, much reduced, including by motorway, is a residential development which makes up part of the Pound Hill neighbourhood of Crawley, West Sussex. Many of the roads have equestrianism names, or names reflecting the previous owners of the land.

==== Crabbet Manor ====
The Blunt family (and to include one generation prior, that of a female ancestor, the Gale family), of whom Wilfred was the primogeniture heir, inherited the manor and forests of Worth including Crabbet Park House, erected in Queen Anne Style, since the year 1698. The house was later bought by Lady Wentworth and passed to her daughter Lady Winifred Tryon, who sold it; today, it is an office block and its royal tennis court has been restored.

== Bibliography and external links ==
- Archer, Rosemary, Colin Pearson and Cecil Covey. The Crabbet Arabian Stud: Its History and Influence. Crabbet Organisation, 1978. ISBN 0-906382-13-0
- Blunt, Lady Anne. Bedouin Tribes of the Euphrates. ASIN: B00088K2HA
- Blunt, Lady Anne. A Pilgrimage to Nejd. Reprint. David & Charles, 1985. ISBN 0-7126-0989-X
- Wentworth, Judith Anne Dorothea Blunt-Lytton. The Authentic Arabian Horse, 3rd ed. George Allen & Unwin Ltd., 1979.
- Winstone, H.V.F. Lady Anne Blunt: A Biography, Barzan Pub., 2003. ISBN 1-900988-57-7
- The Crabbet Influence Magazine
- Mulder, Carol W."Skowronek" archived December 16, 2009, and originally published in The Crabbet Influence, May/June 1989
