= Khaled 5 =

Arabian horse

Khaled
- Breed: Arabian
- Sire: *Nimr
- Grandsire: Kismet
- Dam: *Naomi
- Sex: Stallion
- Foaled: 1895
- Country: United States
- Color: Chestnut
- Breeder: Randolph Huntington

Khaled AHR# 5, often referred to as Khaled 5, was an Arabian horse that was one of the foundation horses of the Arabian Horse Registry of America. He was a chestnut stallion foaled on May 24, 1895, by the stallion *Nimr and out of the mare *Naomi. He was bred by Randolph Huntington of Oyster Bay, New York, who was noted for his efforts to promote and protect the Arabian breed. Khaled 5 was the sire of nineteen registered purebred Arabian foals.

His dam, *Naomi, was born in England of desert-bred Arabian horses, and imported to the United States by Huntington in 1888. She was noted as an outstanding field hunter. His sire, Nimr, was also a grandson of *Naomi, and hence Khaled was somewhat linebred. Nimr was also born in England and was imported by Huntington to the United States in 1893. Huntington also imported Khaled's paternal grandsire, the desertbred *Kismet, from England to the US in 1891.
