= H. V. F. Winstone =

English writer

Harry Victor Frederick Winstone FRGS (3 August 1926 – 10 February 2010), known as "Victor", was an English author and journalist, who specialised in Middle Eastern topics. He wrote biographies of several influential figures in the history of this region.

Victor Winstone worked as a reporter and features writer with weekly journals and a financial features agency from 1947 to 1950. He was an industrial journal editor and press advisor to Royal Doulton and others during the 1950s and 1960s. From 1970 to 1982, he was a freelance writer and magazine editor, chiefly of journals about decorative and applied arts (Pottery Gazette, Tableware International, Home and Table, Ambassador). He also wrote for industrial and commercial publications and was the supervisory editor of the English edition of Automobile World (Zurich).

From 1975 to 1990, he was freelance special features writer for The Guardian, book reviewer for The Daily Telegraph, and was a contributor to Connoisseur, The Times, and various specialist journals.

Winstone’s first biography was published in 1976 to positive reviews: Captain Shakespear: A Portrait, a study of the explorer William Shakespear. A series of critically well-regarded books followed, mainly biographies of British figures associated with the nineteenth and twentieth century history of the Middle East, such as Gertrude Bell, Gerard Leachman, Leonard Woolley, Howard Carter and Lady Anne Blunt.

Winstone was a Fellow of the Royal Geographical Society. Prior to his death, he lived in Bideford, north Devon, England.

Winstone died from lung cancer on 10 February 2010.

== Selected books and articles by H. V. F. Winstone ==
- Kuwait: Prospect and Reality London: Allen and Unwin (1972) (with Zahra Freeth)
- Captain Shakespear: A Portrait London: Jonathan Cape (1976)
- Gertrude Bell: A Biography London: Jonathan Cape (1978)
- Explorers of Arabia from the Renaissance to the End of the Victorian Era London: Allen and Unwin (1978) (edited by H. V. F. Winstone and Zahra Freeth)
- The Spirit of the East: An Anthology of Prose and Verse Inspired by the People, Places, and Legends of the East London: Quartet (1979) (edited by H. V. F. Winstone and Gerald de Gaury)
- "A Journey to Hail" Saudi Aramco World 31(3) (May/June 1980) (with Zahra Freeth)
- The Road to Kabul: An Anthology London: Quartet (1981) (edited by H. V. F. Winstone and Gerald de Gaury)
- Diaries of Parker Pasha (ed.) London: Quartet (1982)
- The Illicit Adventure. The Story of Political and Military Intelligence in the Middle East from 1898 to 1926 London: Jonathan Cape (1982)
- Leachman, OC Desert: The Life of Lieutenant-Colonel Gerard Leachman D.S.O London: Quartet (1982)
- Royal Copenhagen Porcelain London: Stacey International (1983)
- Uncovering the Ancient World London: Constable (1985)
- Woolley of Ur London: Secker and Warburg (1990)
- Howard Carter and the discovery of the tomb of Tutankhamun London: Constable (1991)
- Lady Anne Blunt Manchester: Barzan Publishing (2003)
