= W. K. Kellogg Arabian Horse Center =

Research facility in Pomona, California

Coordinates: 34.058958°N 117.815108°W

- Established: 1925
- Location: Pomona, California, United States
- Website: W. K. Kellogg Arabian Horse Center

The W. K. Kellogg Arabian Horse Center is a research facility on the campus of the California State Polytechnic University, Pomona (Cal Poly Pomona) which specializes on equine studies, breeding and research.

== History ==
Former seal of the Institute as part of the University of California (1932-1943)

The horse center dates back to 1925. W.K. Kellogg had a longtime interest in Arabian horses, and purchased 377 acres (1.5 km^{2}) for $250,000 in Pomona, California, to establish a ranch. After erecting the first buildings, Kellogg funded the development of an Arabian horse breeding program, which (as of 2008) remains the oldest in the United States and the fifth largest in the country.

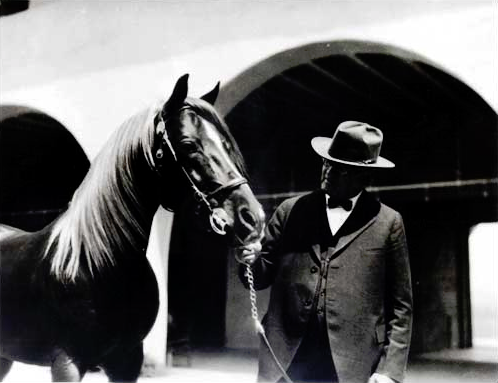
W.K. Kellogg and his Arabian horse Antez

Starting with breeding stock descended from the imports of Homer Davenport and W.R. Brown, Kellogg then looked to England, where he purchased a significant number of horses from the Crabbet Arabian Stud, making multiple importations during the 1920s. The Kellogg ranch became well known in southern California not only for its horse breeding program but also for its entertaining, weekly horse exhibitions, open to the public and frequently visited by assorted Hollywood celebrities. Among many other connections to Hollywood, the actor Rudolph Valentino borrowed the Kellogg stallion, "Jadaan," for use in his 1926 movie, Son of the Sheik, along with a Kellogg employee, Carl Raswan, who rode in certain scenes as Valentino's stunt double.

In 1932, Kellogg donated the ranch, which had grown to 750-acre (3.0 km^{2}) to the University of California, requiring that the property would be used for educational purposes, the herd of Arabian horses must be maintained, and the horse shows would continue. It was until 1943, during World War II, that the ranch was taken over by the U.S. War Department and was known as the Pomona Quartermaster Depot (Remount). In 1948, the ranch was transferred to the U.S. Department of Agriculture and in 1949 the ranch was turned over to the state of California. Title to the then 813-acre (3.3 km^{2}) ranch and horses was passed to the State of California.

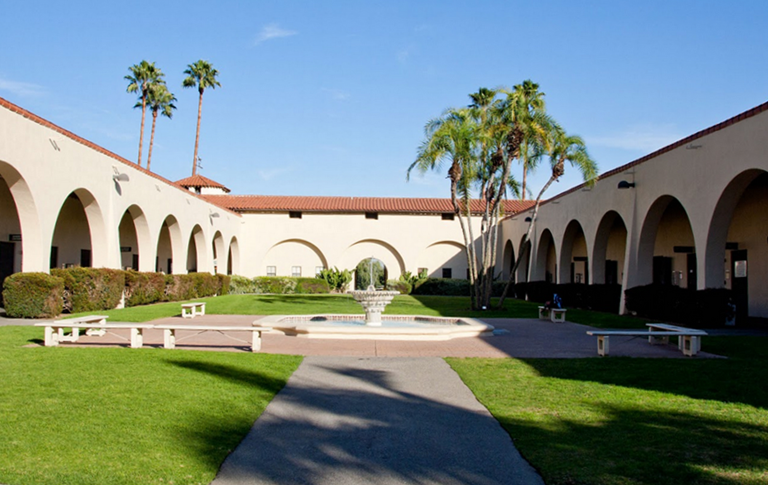
Stables of the Kellogg ranch

The ranch became part of the Voorhis unit of what was then known as the California Polytechnic State College in San Luis Obispo. This became known as the Kellogg Campus, and in 1966, it was separated to form California State Polytechnic College Pomona (now California State Polytechnic University, Pomona). The Center occupied the original Kellogg stables prior to the dedication of the existing facility on April 6, 1974.

This was also the location of the W.K. Kellogg Airport (not to be confused with the W. K. Kellogg Airport in Battle Creek, Michigan). It operated from 1928 to 1932, and was then the largest privately owned airport in the country.

== Today ==
Today the facility is home to approximately 85 purebred Arabian horses used in Equine Sciences’ teachings, outreach, research and internationally recognized breeding and training programs. Facilities at the center include 38 acres (150,000 m^{2}) of pasture, three barns, foaling stalls, a breeding area, a veterinary clinic, a farrier shop, four arenas and a grandstand.

The University operates the W.K. Kellogg Arabian Horse Library, which is open to the public.

== See also ==
- Judith Blunt-Lytton, 16th Baroness Wentworth
