= United States Army Remount Service =

US agency that bred horses for the US Army

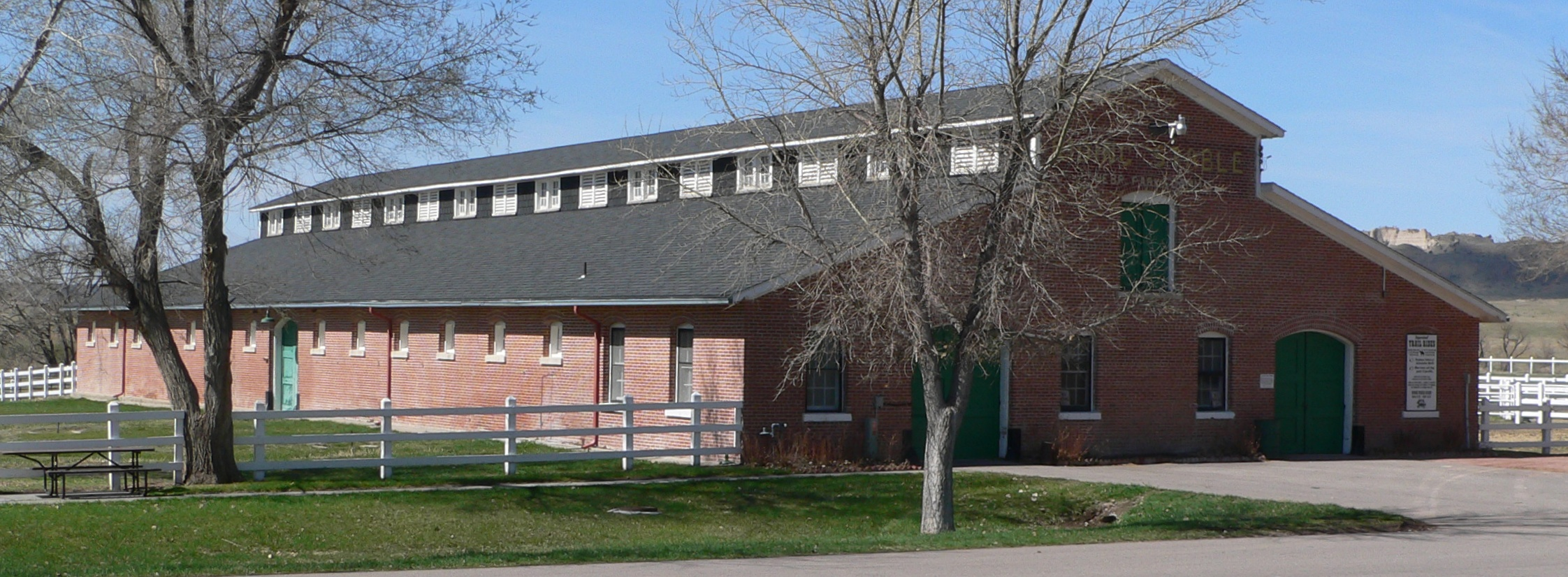
Stables at Fort Robinson, Nebraska, which became the largest army remount station in the USA

A part of the Quartermaster Corps, the U.S. Army Remount Service provided horses (and later mules and dogs) as remounts to U.S. Army units. Evolving from both the Remount Service of the Quartermaster Corps and a general horse-breeding program under the control of the Department of Agriculture, the Remount Service began systematically breeding horses for the United States Cavalry in 1918. It remained in operation until 1948, when all animal-breeding programs returned to Department of Agriculture control.

== Early history ==
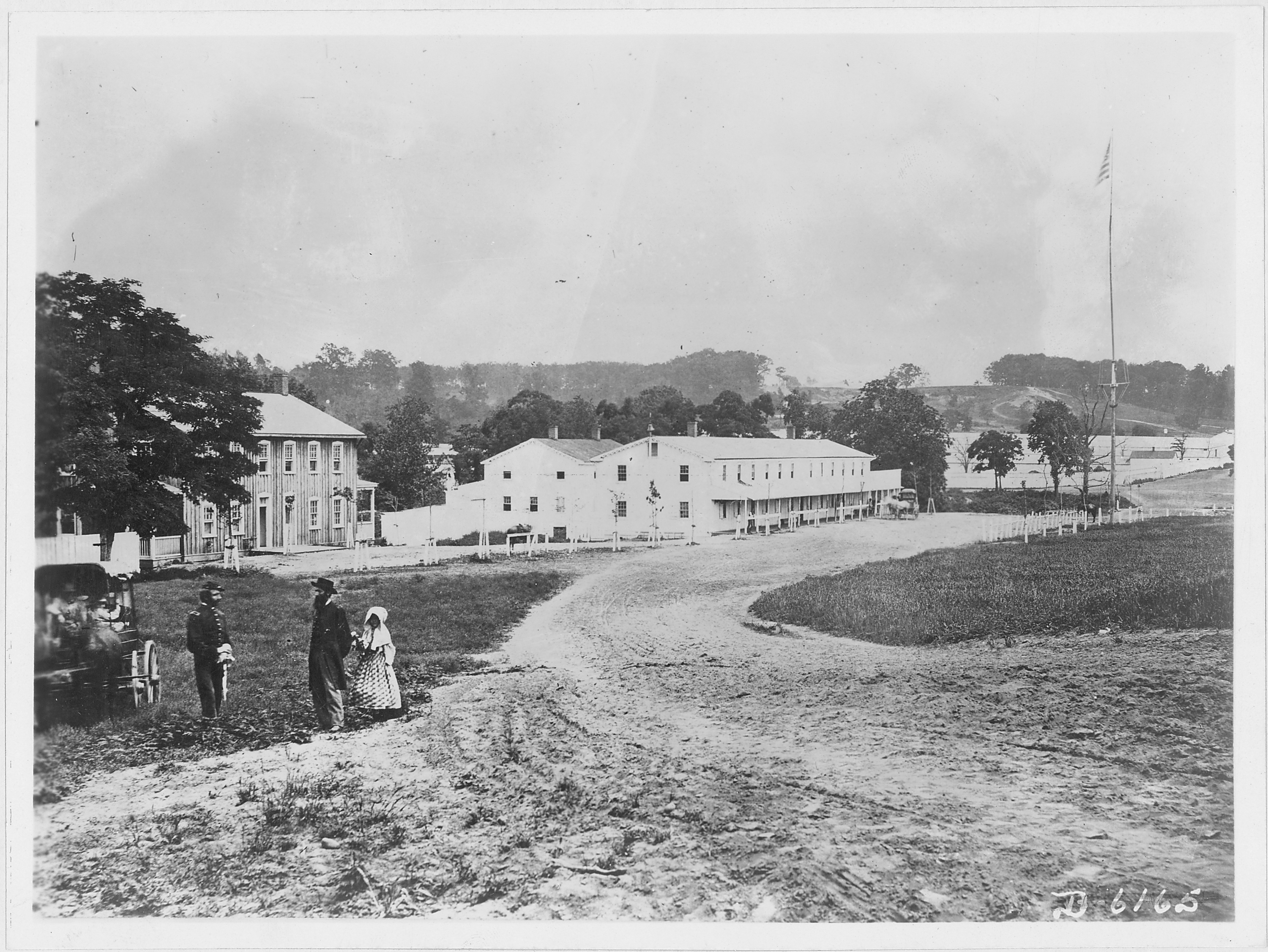
Giesboro Point Remount station depot headquarters and stables, Washington, DC, circa 1865

The Remount Service had its roots in the expansion of the Union Army during the first days of the Civil War. It was determined that the Federal Government would provide horses for all cavalry and artillery units. This was in direct contrast to the Confederate practice of making each cavalry trooper provide his own horse. Once implemented, the existing system of regimental purchasing boards was quickly overwhelmed and unsuited for dealing with newly raised regiments. In response, the Quartermaster Corps created two different organizations, one for field artillery and another for cavalry, to purchase the large number of horses needed to equip both Regular Army units and state-raised volunteer units. The Quartermaster General's Office oversaw the purchase of draft horses and mules, while the newly created Cavalry Bureau did the same for all cavalry remounts.

The new Cavalry Bureau encountered a number of problems from the very beginning. Inadequate staff, poor leadership, and corruption on the part of many horse dealers and buyers combined to halt the flow of remounts to regiments. Command stability was a major issue. During the almost nine months of its existence (late July 1863 through mid-April 1864), the Bureau had no fewer than four commanders. Of those four, only James H. Wilson could be considered successful—and he held the office for less than 60 days. The first commander, General George Stoneman, had led the Cavalry Corps of the Army of the Potomac prior to his posting. General Kenner Garrard, his successor, "held the post for less than a month."

There was also confusion as to the role of the Bureau when it came to training horses, providing cavalry equipment, and serving as rest and recuperation points for horses turned in as unserviceable. Many problems were never resolved before the end of the war because the Cavalry Bureau had ceased functioning in a real sense before 1865. By mid-April 1864, the Quartermaster's Department regained control of horse purchasing for cavalry, while the Bureau's equipment procurement and inspection duties fell to "a cavalry officer especially assigned to that duty". That officer, in turn, reported to General Halleck, who assumed "the duties of chief of the Cavalry Bureau". The Army's first experiment with centralized purchasing and organization for cavalry forces ended before the conclusion of the Civil War.

In spite of its many organizational challenges, leadership issues, and brief existence, the Cavalry Bureau is noteworthy for what it did accomplish. Central remount depots were established at Giesboro Point, near Washington DC, and near Saint Louis, Missouri. Intended to serve mounted regiments in the Eastern and Western theaters of the War, respectively, the depots were supplied with horses purchased at markets in nine major locations. Each depot could handle between 10,000 and 16,000 horses, with General Stoneman suggesting the construction of a third depot during his time as Bureau commander.

== After the Civil War ==
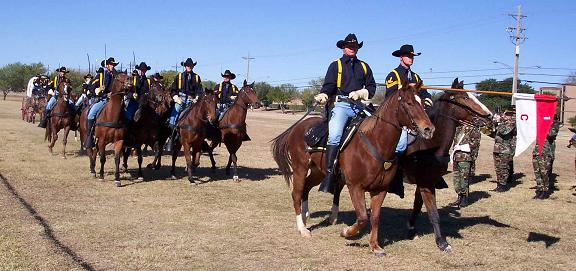
Horse Cavalry detachment of the U.S. Army's 1st Cavalry, demonstrating equipment and tactics of the 1880s

Although the Cavalry Bureau ceased to function before the end of the War, the need for remounts did not end with Lee's surrender in 1865. With 10 cavalry regiments in the Regular Army, the decision was made to return to the contract system to obtain remounts. The Quartermaster's Department conducted the actual purchasing. Although required by Army Regulations, this system did little to remove the dual problems of quality control and corruption. During the Indian Wars period, this often took the form of boards of officers who traveled to various horse markets and made purchases on a local level after inspecting the stock on hand.

== The 20th century ==
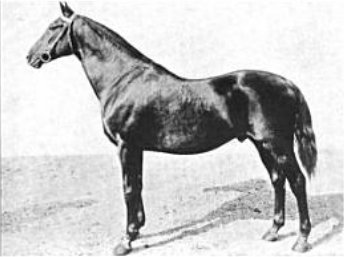
Henry of Navarre, a Thoroughbred race horse after retirement to stud with the Army Remount Service, 1917

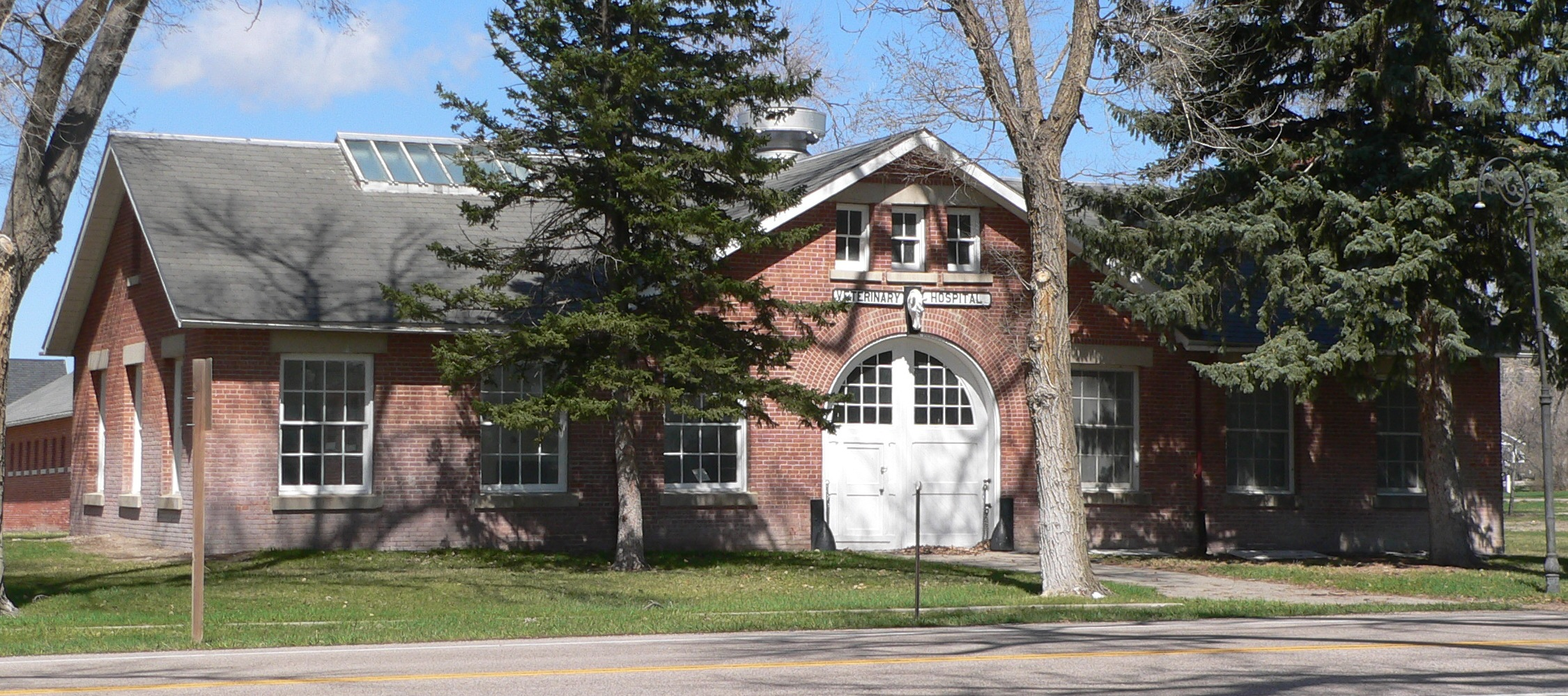
Veterinary hospital at Fort Robinson, built 1909

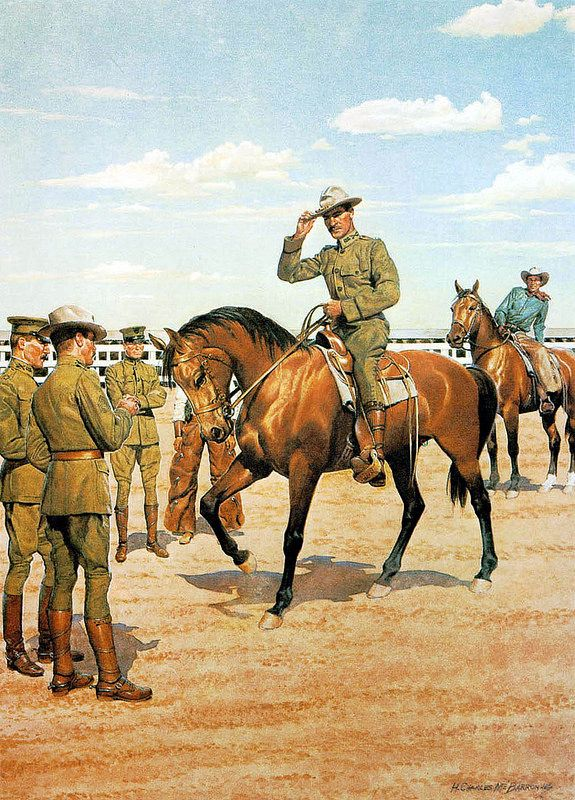
Scene at the remount depot at Fort Reno, Oklahoma in 1908.

Although the need for some sort of remount bureau or office had been recognized since the end of the Civil War, formal steps were not taken, or funding made available, until the first decade of the 20th century. In 1908, the Remount Service was officially activated as part of the Quartermaster Corps with Purchasing Boards set up in Boise, Idaho; Front Royal, Virginia; Lexington, Kentucky; Sheridan, Wyoming; San Angelo, Texas; Colorado Springs, Colorado; and Sacramento, California. These Boards were intended to take the place of the earlier regimental boards. In May of the same year, the Quartermaster Corps took the next logical step and set up the Fort Reno Quartermaster Depot as a "processing/distribution center for military horses and mules".

There was also a determined attempt to engage professional horse breeders in the Remount Service, beginning in 1918 with the approval of a breeding plan for cavalry horses that combined the efforts of the Remount Service with the Bureau of Animal Industry. A 1921 issue of the Cavalry Journal contained an update from the "American Remount Association" calling for owners of "high-class registered Thoroughbreds" to add their stallions to the program. The author also mentioned a reduced-cost registry for "half-breed" Thoroughbreds.

The number of horses involved in the program remained high even into the final years of the Remount Service. As late as 1945, between 450 and 500 stallions owned by the government and over 11,000 civilian-owned mares produced 7,293 foals. Thoroughbreds predominated in the stallion rolls, although a few Morgans, Arabians, and Standardbreds were also used. The number of Arabian stallions increased greatly in 1943 with the addition of the Kellogg Arabian Ranch (renamed the Pomona Remount Depot) to the program.

In 1942, the Remount Service (then called the Remount Division) printed a breakdown of its breeding program in the Cavalry Journal. According to the article, the primary breeding horse was the Thoroughbred (17,983 mares and 688 stallions), followed by Arabians (375 mares and 16 stallions), followed by Morgans, Saddlebreds, Anglo-Arabians, and the Cleveland Bay (trailing with eight mares and one stallion). Of the foals born in 1941, 11,028 of the 11,409 reported were Thoroughbreds.

== List of remount depots and areas ==
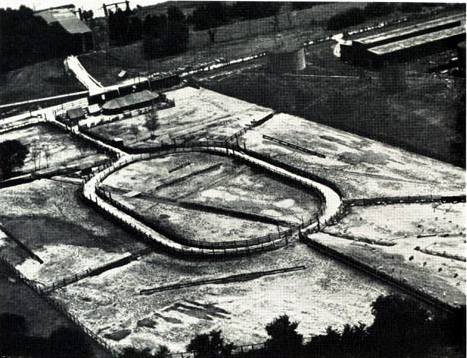
Camp Plauche Animal Remount Station, Louisiana, 1944

As noted above, the location of both remount depots and areas changed over time, expanding and contracting based on the needs of the Army and general development of the system. Significant remount depots included:

- Fort Robinson, Nebraska
- Aleshire Quartermaster Remount Depot, Front Royal, Virginia
- Fort Keogh, Montana
- Fort Sam Houston Remount Station #1, Texas
- Fort Reno, Oklahoma
- Pomona Quartermaster Depot (Remount), California
- Fort Sill, Oklahoma
- Camp Plauche Animal Remount Station, Louisiana

=== Remount areas ===
In 1944, six remount areas (reduced from seven in earlier years) were functioning. These areas served to control both the breeding programs and purchasing functions of the Remount Service and worked in conjunction with the depots. The Areas had headquarters at Front Royal (Virginia), Lexington (Kentucky), Colorado Springs (Colorado), Sheridan (Wyoming), San Angelo (Texas), and Pomona Quartermaster Depot (California).

== See also ==
- United States Army Cavalry School
- Cavalry (United States)
