= Ali Pasha Sherif =

Egyptian government official and breeder of Arabian horses (1834–1897)

Ali Pasha Sherif

Ali Pasha Mohamed Sherif (1834 – February 26, 1897) (alt spelling, from French Ali Pacha Chérif) was an Albanian-Egyptian government official and a renowned breeder of Arabian horses during the late 19th century.

== Family background ==
Born in Egypt, Ali Pasha Sherif was a son of El Sayed Muhammad Sherif Pasha El-Kebir (d. February 13, 1865). His brothers were Osman Bey and Halil Şerif Paşa (also known as Khalil Sherif Pasha).

== Early life ==
As a child, Ali Pasha Sherif developed a love of horses and horsemanship, and he later developed contacts with many desert Bedouin chieftains who were owners and breeders of Arabian horses. Also, as a child and young man, he was exposed to the Arabian horses collected by Muhammad Ali Pasha and his successor Abbas I of Egypt, also known as Abbas I Pasha, or Abbas Pasha.

In the first half of his life, Ali Pasha Sherif went by the name Ali Bey or Ali Bey Fahmy. As a teen, he attended the same elite boarding school at El-Khanka that his father had attended. His father next enrolled him in the École Militaire Égyptienne, a school established by Muhammad Ali Pasha in 1844 in Paris to train men for effective service in the Egyptian military corps. After completing his studies at the École Militaire Égyptienne, Ali Bey continued his education at the School of Application for the Staff, located on the Rue de Grenelle, Paris, close to Les Invalides, many graduates of which were selected to become staff officers in the French army. As a result of this training Ali Bey became an artillery colonel in Mohammed Ali's Egyptian Army.

== Career achievements ==
Following the death of his father in 1865, Ali Bey was notified by the Ottoman authorities in Constantinople that he was now qualified to use the title "Ali Sherif Pasha". However, he usually wrote his new name and title as "Ali Pasha Sherif", or its French form, "Ali Pacha Chérif." In his new capacity he served Egypt throughout the reigns of Khedives Tewfik Pasha and Abbas Hilmi Pasha (aka Abbas II). At one point in his career, he was awarded the title of Knight Commander of the Order of the Star of India by Queen Victoria. He was head of Egypt's Legislative Assembly during the 1890s.

== Slave scandal ==
In 1894, while he was head of the Legislative Assembly, Ali was arrested for purchasing enslaved Sudanese women for domestic service. He and others were tried in September 1894. He was freed, but his request for Italian protection tarnished his image among Egyptian nationalists.

== Breeder of Arabian horses ==
Ali Bey first obtained a few Arabian horses while his father was governor of Syria, and obtained others directly from the breeding program of Abbas I Pasha. When Abbas I was murdered in 1854, his Arabian horses were inherited by his eighteen-year-old son Ibrahim Ilhami Pasha (aka El Hami Pasha) who had little interest in them, giving away several. Upon Ibrahim's death, his estate was bankrupt, and the executors of his estate sold his remaining horses at auction in December 1860. Ali Pasha Sherif purchased approximately 30 horses of the original Abbas I Pasha stock, ultimately owning four hundred horses by 1873.

Ali Pasha Sherif was reputed to have kept extensive records and manuscripts about his stud, which were passed on to his son, Huseyn Bey Sherif, who lent them to King Fouad. These were never returned, and they are now considered lost.

In the late 1870s, a devastating epidemic of African horse sickness hit Egypt, killing thousands of horses, including many horses of prized bloodlines. Only the horses Ali Pasha Sherif had moved to upper Egypt were saved. As he aged, Ali Pasha Sherif's health failed and he encountered financial and political problems, leading to many problems for his stud farm, including a decline in the quality of his stock due to managers who bred to pedigree with no assessment of the ensuing livestock and often engaging in inbreeding.

In 1880 Ali Pasha Sherif made the acquaintance of Wilfred and Lady Anne Blunt. Though he was generally reluctant to sell horses to foreigners, he eventually sold them the stallion Mesaoud in 1889 as well as other horses. Ali Pasha Sherif died in 1897, and a month after his death his remaining horses went up for auction. At that time, Lady Anne Blunt was able to purchase many of the best for her Sheykh Obeyd stud, later exporting some to their Crabbet Arabian Stud in England.

== See also ==
- Arabian horse
- Lady Anne Blunt
- Crabbet Arabian Stud
- Muhammad Ali Dynasty
