= Anne Blunt, 15th Baroness Wentworth =

British musician and horse breeder (1837–1917)

The Right Honourable The Baroness Wentworth
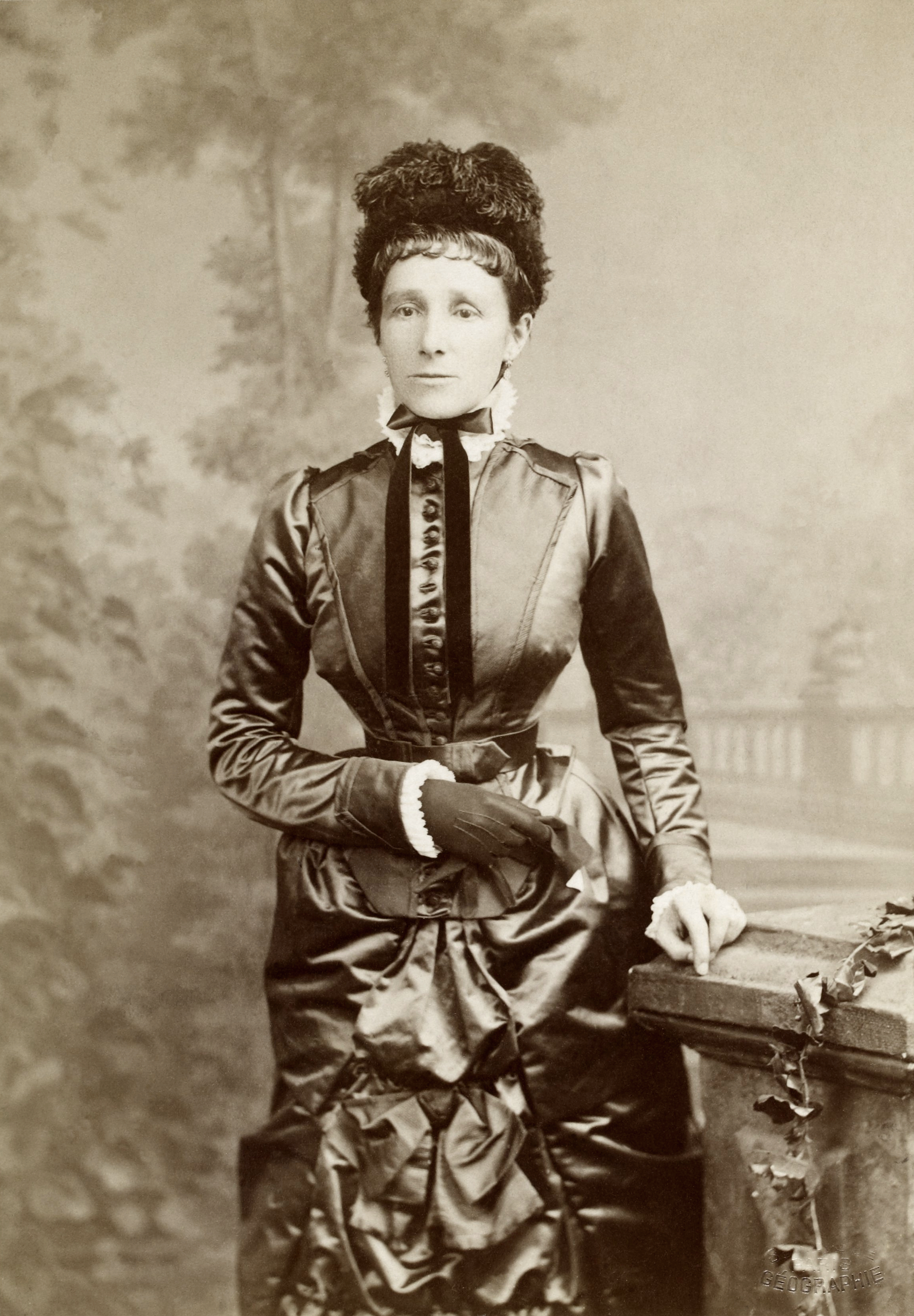
- Lady Anne Blunt, 1883

Personal details
- Born: Hon. Anne Isabella King; 22 September 1837 England
- Died: 15 December 1917 (aged 80) Cairo, Egypt
- Spouse: Wilfrid Blunt (m. 1869)
- Children: Judith Blunt-Lytton, 16th Baroness Wentworth
- Parents: William King-Noel, 1st Earl of Lovelace; Augusta Ada Byron
- Known for: Arabian horse breeder; artist; musician

Anne Isabella Noel Blunt, 15th Baroness Wentworth (née King, later King-Noel; 22 September 1837 – 15 December 1917), known for most of her life as Lady Anne Blunt, along with her husband the poet Wilfrid Blunt, was co-founder of the Crabbet Arabian Stud in England and the Sheykh Obeyd estate near Cairo. The two married on 8 June 1869. From the late 1870s, Wilfrid and Lady Anne travelled extensively in Arabia and the Middle East, buying Arabian horses from Bedouin princes such as Emir Fendi Al-Fayez and the Egyptian Ali Pasha Sherif. Among the great and influential horses they took to England were Azrek, Dajania, Queen of Sheba, Rodania and the famous Ali Pasha Sherif stallion Mesaoud. To this day, the vast majority of purebred Arabian horses trace their lineage to at least one Crabbet ancestor.

== Life and work ==
Lady Anne was a daughter of William King-Noel, 1st Earl of Lovelace, and the Hon. Augusta Ada Byron, the world's first computer programmer. Her maternal grandparents were the poet Lord Byron and Anne Isabella "Annabella" Noel-Byron, 12th Baroness Wentworth (née Milbanke). In childhood, she was known as Annabella, after the grandmother for whom she was named.

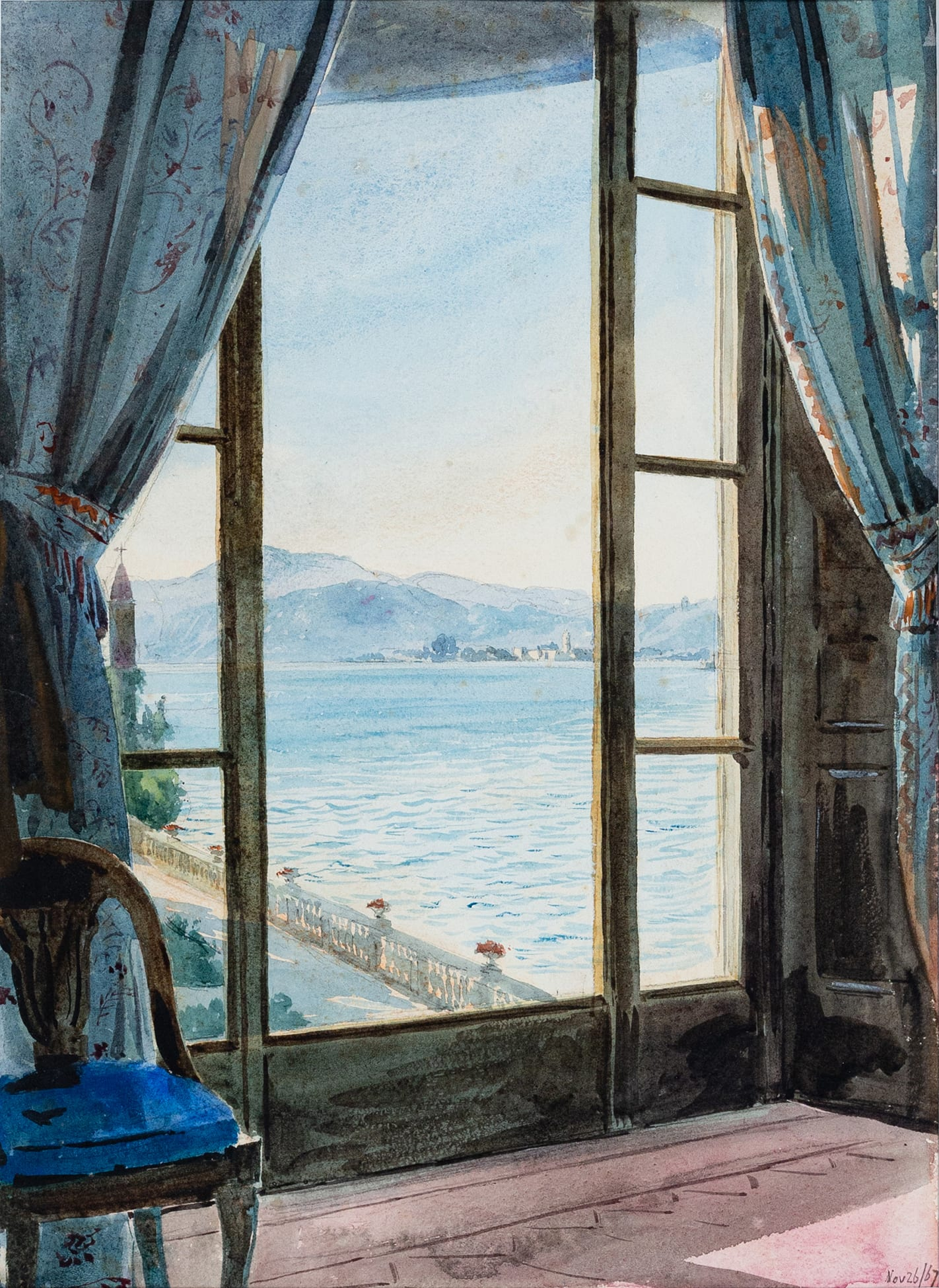
A watercolour by Lady Anne described as "'Window onto an (?)Italian lake'. Dated 'Nov.26 / (18)67'. Inscribed verso of backing and dated 1868. 15x11 inches."

Lady Anne was fluent in French, German, Italian, Spanish and Arabic, a skilled violinist and a gifted artist who studied drawing with John Ruskin. She also had a lifelong love of horses, dating from childhood, and was an accomplished equestrienne. Her interest in the Arabian horse, combined with Wilfrid's interest in Middle Eastern politics, led to their mutual interest in saving the Arabian breed and thus their many journeys.

Lady Anne travelled extensively in the Middle East and is particularly noted as the first European woman to ride through the Arabian desert to reach the city of Ha'il. The books Bedouin Tribes of the Euphrates and A Pilgrimage to Nejd are attributed to her and were based on her journals, but were extensively edited by her husband. Her own voice comes through more clearly in her published journals.

She owned a violin made by Stradivarius, since known as the Lady Blunt Stradivarius, though she was not the original owner. It was extensively refurbished in 1864 by Jean Baptiste Vuillaume, from whom she purchased the instrument upon recommendation of her instructor, Leopold Jansa. She possessed the instrument for 30 years, selling it in 1895.

Lady Anne's 1869 marriage to Blunt was not a happy one. Her many pregnancies produced a single surviving child, Judith Blunt-Lytton, 16th Baroness Wentworth. Anne never ceased to grieve over her miscarriages and the babies who died soon after birth. Although a fond father to Judith when she was a child, Blunt made no secret that he would have preferred a son.

Lady Anne and Wilfrid differed over management of their horses, with Wilfrid, though the less talented horseman, often prevailing on management decisions. At times, this meant leaving valuable bloodstock in Egypt under the care of inept managers who neglected the horses to the point that some died of exposure and thirst. In England, his theory that Arabian horses should live under "desert conditions", even in a cold, damp climate, often meant the animals lived with insufficient fodder and were exposed to the elements to an unnecessary degree.

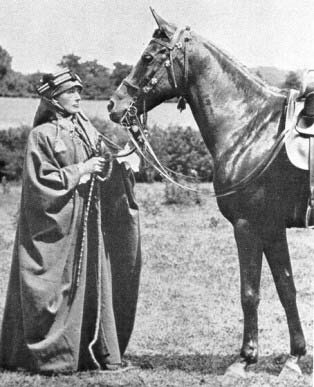
Lady Anne Blunt and Kasida, her favorite riding mare

Blunt also had many mistresses, often simultaneously. However, in 1906, when his mistress Dorothy Carleton (later adopted as his niece) moved into their home, Lady Anne, unable to tolerate what she termed an "oriental" lifestyle, left him. The Blunts agreed to a formal separation and the Stud was divided. Lady Anne signed a Deed of Partition drawn up by Wilfrid. Under its terms, Lady Anne kept Crabbet Park and half the horses, while Blunt took Caxtons Farm, also known as Newbuildings, and the rest of the stock. Following the separation, Lady Anne spent several months each year at her Sheykh Obeyd estate near Cairo, a 32-acre (129,000 m^{2}) apricot orchard the Blunts had purchased in 1882 and set up as a breeding farm for the horses they owned in Egypt. Her daughter Judith lived full-time at the Crabbet estate with her own husband and children. Finally, leaving the stud under the management of Judith, Lady Anne left England permanently in October 1915 and spent the remaining years of her life at Sheykh Obeyd.

== Legacy ==
Shortly before her death in 1917, Lady Anne inherited the Wentworth title after her niece, Ada King-Milbanke, 14th Baroness Wentworth, died childless. Wilfrid, always short of money, made a number of attempts to get Lady Anne to sign control or ownership of her portion of Crabbet to him, going so far at one point as to alienate Judith and her mother to the point that Lady Anne disinherited Judith (though she chose not to favour Wilfrid). Following Lady Anne's death in 1917, the Wentworth title passed to Judith, who by that time owned some horses and property in her own right, and Lady Anne bequeathed her remaining portion of Crabbet to Judith's daughters, appointing a trustee to oversee the estate.

Wilfrid and Judith disputed Lady Anne's estate and the ownership of many horses. The bitter battle went to court, where a verdict in favour of Judith's children was rendered in 1920, invalidating the deed of partition and reunifying most of the stud. Wilfrid died in 1922, having verbally reconciled with Judith but without rewriting his will to grant her any inheritance of his remaining property. Over time, Judith had managed to buy out her daughters' shares of Crabbet and Newbuidings from the trustee, buy back many of the horses Wilfrid had sold to third parties, and the Crabbet stud continued under Judith's management.

Under Judith, her management and breeding decisions improved upon the "desert conditions" theories of Wilfrid. Her addition of non-desertbred Arabian stock, such as the Polish-bred Arabian stallion Skowronek, created controversy, but the stud survived and prospered for almost fifty years until 1971, when the property itself was bisected by a motorway. Judith sold Crabbet horses all over the world, including to Dora Maclean in Australia and others in the United States, Spain and Russia. She sold some horses bred from the Blunt lines back to Egypt, where they have a legacy today. Modern studs known for Crabbet breeding include Al-Marah in America and "Fenwick" in Australia, which can both trace their bloodlines to large-scale importations of horses bred at Crabbet.

Today, due to the worldwide dispersal of Crabbet stock over its near-century of existence, most modern Arabian horses contain lines to Crabbet breeding, regardless of their nation of birth. Over 90% of all Arabians registered in the United States, for example, contain one or more lines to the Crabbet Park Stud. Some "Crabbet" breeders consider themselves preservationists, maintaining a small pool of pure or high-percentage Crabbet horses, while others use these lines as an outcross on other strains. In either situation, Crabbet-bred Arabian horses have a reputation for athleticism and classic type, good temperament, performance ability and soundness.

The Lady Blunt Stradivarius is now considered one of the best-preserved Stradivarius violins in the world. It was sold at auction in Japan in 2011 for a world record high of £9.8 million (US$15.9 million). It was previously sold for £84,500 (US$200,000), also a record at the time, in 1971.

== Publications ==
- Archer, Rosemary, Colin Pearson and Cecil Covey. The Crabbet Arabian Stud: Its History and Influence.
- Blunt, Lady Anne, Bedouin Tribes of the Euphrates
- Blunt, Lady Anne, A Pilgrimage to Nejd
- Blunt, Lady Anne, Lady Anne Blunt: Journals and Correspondence, 1878–1917
- Wentworth, Judith Anne Dorothea Blunt-Lytton. The Authentic Arabian Horse, 3rd ed. George Allen & Unwin Ltd., 1979.
- Winstone, H.V.F., Lady Anne Blunt: A Biography, Manchester: Barzan Publishing, 2005

Peerage of England
Preceded by Ada King-Milbanke	Baroness Wentworth; 1917	Succeeded by Judith Blunt-Lytton
