= Saklawi horse =

Arabian horse strain

Saklawi (Arabic: صقلاوي, ṣaqlāwiyy), Seglawi or Siglavy in Central Europe, is one of the five mythical Arabian horse bloodlineages recognized as pure by the Bedouins, the Al Khamsa. Selected by the Ruwallah and Anizah, two nomadic tribes of the Arabian Desert, this lineage was imported to Egypt several times in the 19th and 20th centuries, and is still bred today in Saudi Arabia and Iran.

A "feminine" breed, Saklawi horses are relatively small, but renowned for their beauty, finesse and endurance, which are superior to those of other Arabian horse lineages. They are generally bay-colored. Imported to Central Europe in the early 19th century, they have influenced several other local horse breeds, in particular the Lipizzan, Shagya and Gidran.

== Name ==
There are many variations in the spelling of the name: Siglavy, Saglawi (in Egypt), Seglawi, Seklavi and Saklawiyah, and сиглави in Russian.

== History ==
The Saklawi lineage is identified as one of the five founding lineages descended from the Al Khamsa (الخمسة), the five mares that Bedouin nomads see as the origin of the Arabian breed, the quality of belonging or not to the lineage being transmitted through the dam brood mare. According to the University of Oklahoma study, modern breeders of Arabian horses more generally consider Saklawi to be one of the three great types of the Arabian breed, along with Koheilan and Muniqi. According to a chronicle written by English observers in the mid-19th century, the Bedouin Arabs hold "Saklawiyah" horses in high esteem, as it is not uncommon, when one of them is thrown off by an opposing rider, for him to exclaim "O Felan! The mare that fate has given you is of noble blood. It is of the Saklawiyah breed, and its dam is ridden by Awath, the Sheikh of the Fedhan'".

This lineage is said to have been raised by Ibn el Derre of the Ruwallah tribe (a nomadic tribe of the Arabian Desert whose territory covers present-day Syria, northern Saudi Arabia and part of Jordan), and to be descended from Koheilat Ajuz. Prince Mehemet Ali considered the Saklawi to be the bravest of Arabian horses, believing it could fight to defend its master. It seems that Abbas I Hilmi of Egypt paid a colossal sum of over £3,000 in the 1850s (representing between £289,300 and £10 million today) to acquire a mare of Saglawi Jedran lineage in present-day Saudi Arabia. Another source states that he acquired all the Saglawi Jedran horses from the Bedouin tribe of Anizah. In general, several written sources indicate that Saklawi horses were brought to Egypt in the 19th and 20th centuries, including Ghazieh, a Ruwallah mare too weak to cross the desert, who was transported by cart to Cairo, and Gamil-el-Kebir, ancestor of the famous Arabian stallion Dahman-el-Azrak, and its son Rabdan. The second volume of the breed registry of the Inshass stud in Egypt shows that the person who managed this stud for King Farouk, Dr Rasheed, had a clear preference for the Saklawi lineage.

== Description ==
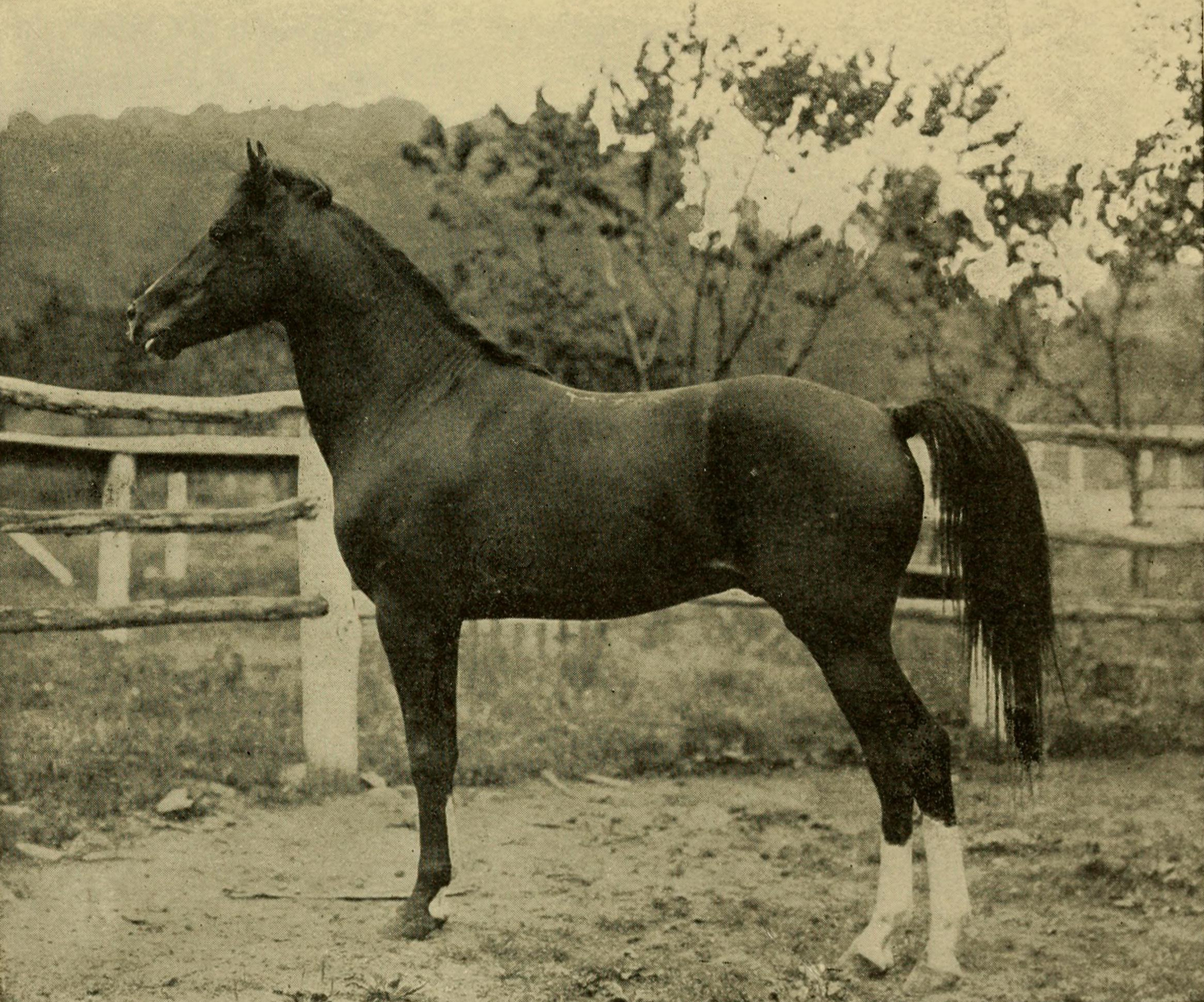
Hamrah, a Saklawi foal out of a mare bred by the Anizah

This Arabian lineage is renowned for its finesse, being known to be more beautiful than the others, with "feminine grace": it symbolizes "beauty and elegance". A 1915 article in the Journal of Science and Practical Agriculture states that the Saklawi is the most beautiful of the Arabian horses and of the horses of the Ottoman Empire, noting that its height ranges from 1.42 m to 1.52 m.

The bones are finer, the head and neck more elongated than in other Arabian horses. The coat is generally bay. The lineage shows speed and endurance. According to the DAD-IS database, in Iran, this lineage is bred for local equestrian sports.

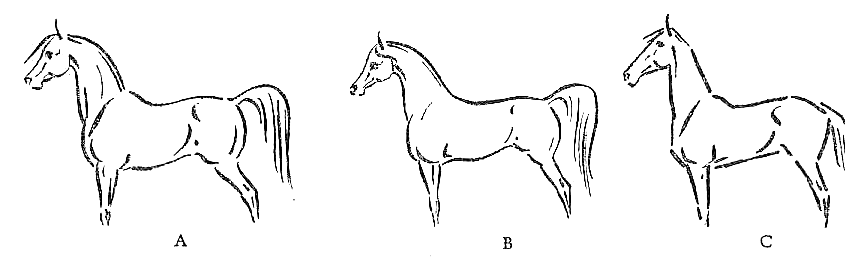
Arabian types: A Koheilan; B Saklawi; C Muniqi

== Influence on European and Russian horse breeds ==
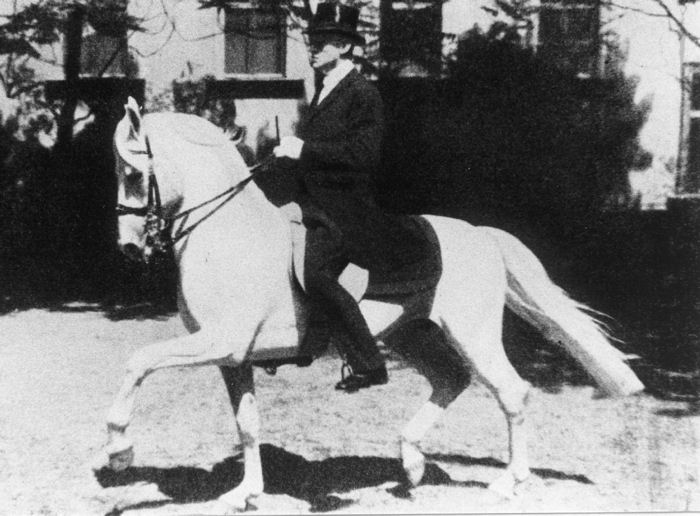
Lipizzan horse from the Spanish Riding School, from the Siglavy lineage

Saklawi horses influenced several European horse breeds selected in Central Europe in the early 19th century. One stallion in the lineage is known to have been the sixth founder stallion of the Lipizzan breed at the Spanish Riding School. This gray Arabian horse, named "Siglavy", was born in 1810 and arrived in Lipica in 1814 or 1816. Of Egyptian origin, this horse was small in stature, measuring just 1.45 m at the withers. Although several Arab stallions made up the Lipizzan, only Siglavy produced a bloodlineage. Currently, these Lipizzans of Siglavy lineage remain renowned for their excellent conformation.

The Bálbona stud farm has been home to several horses of Siglavy stock. An imposing chestnut stallion, imported from Arabia in 1816 and named Gidran Senior, is at the origin of the Hungarian Gidran breed, through his son Gidran II, who began breeding in 1817. Siglavy sires are among the foundation stock of the Shagya breed. The Shagya XX stallion is notably out of a Siglavy-Bagdady mare. A third Hungarian breed, the Nonius, was crossed with Siglavy Arabians early in its development. The Borike stud farm in Croatia was home to Siglavy Arabians, the horses generally originating from the Turkish invasions.

A Siglavy can also be found among the constituent lineages of the old Czech Kladruber horse. The Polish Arabian horse was formed from horses of Koheilan stock, occasionally crossed with Saklawi stallions for refinement.

Starting in 1802, Count and Squire Andrei Fedorovich Rostopchin imported four Arabian stallions of Siglavy and Koheilan stock to his stud farm in Voranava district, near Moscow, and these are at the origin of the so-called Orlov-Rostopchin breed.

== Breeding spread ==
In Iran, the Saklawi lineage is one of nine Arabian horse lineages recognized in the country. It is found in Khuzestan, the Kerman region, Yazd, Fars and Tehran. In Khouzistan, the prestige of horses is measured by the family that bred them: the Saklawi horses of the Ziareh are considered particularly prestigious.

The distribution and number of horses in Saudi Arabia are not known. Today (2005), the number of remaining "pure" Saklawi is estimated to be very low.

== See also ==
- Arabian horse
- List of horse breeds
- Lipizzan
- Shagya Arabian
- Gidran
- Horses in Saudi Arabia
- Horses in Iran
- Siglavy

== Bibliography ==
- Forbis, Judith; Ferriss, Joe (1990). Authentic Arabian bloodstock. Ansata Publications. ISBN 0-9625644-0-0.
- Hendricks, Bonnie (2007). International Encyclopedia of Horse Breeds (2nd ed.). University of Oklahoma Press. ISBN 978-0-8061-3884-8. OCLC 154690199.
- Piduch, Erwin (1988). Egypt's Arab Horses : History and Cultural Heritage. Kentauros-Verlag. ISBN 3-925069-03-8.
- Porter, Valerie; Alderson, Lawrence; Hall, Stephen; Sponenberg, Dan (2016). Mason's World Encyclopedia of Livestock Breeds and Breeding (6th ed.). CAB International. ISBN 978-1-84593-466-8. OCLC 948839453.
- Schiele, Erika (1970). The Arab horse in Europe : history and present breeding of the pure Arab. Harrap.
- Schofler, Patti (2006). Flight without Wings : The Arabian Horse And The Show World. Rowman & Littlefield. ISBN 1-4617-4892-5.
