= Al Khamsa =

Arabian horse strains

"Al Khamsa" (الخمسة) is a designation applied to specific desert-bred bloodlines of the Arabian horse considered particularly "pure" by Arabian horse breeders, who sometimes also describe such lines by use of the Arabic word asil, meaning "pure". It also refers to a mythical origin story of the breed.

Al Khamsa roughly translates as 'The Five'. It refers to a mythical group of foundation mares that were the legendary founders of the Arabian breed. While some breeders claim these mares really existed, there is no objective, historical way to verify such a claim.

The modern definition of an Arabian as Al Khamsa usually refers to a horse that can be verified in every line of its pedigree to trace to specific named desert-bred Arabians with documentation that their breeding was attested to by a Bedouin seller who had sworn a formal oath (generally invoking Allah) that the animal was asil or pure of blood. This standard is only met by approximately two percent of all registered Arabians today. Such horses included the desert-bred imports of the Crabbet Arabian Stud, the imports from Syria of Homer Davenport, many of the horses imported from Egypt that were originally bred by Muhammad Ali of Egypt, Abbas Pasha, Ali Pasha Sherif, or the Royal Agricultural Society and its successor organizations, and other desert-bred horses obtained throughout the Middle East by buyers such as Carl Raswan who were familiar with bloodlines and the formal sales procedures of the Bedouin to properly document animals of Asil bloodlines.

== The Legend ==
The legend of Al Khamsa refers to the five favorite horses of Muhammad. While there are several variants on the tale, a common version states that after a long journey through the desert, Muhammad turned his herd of horses loose at an oasis for a desperately needed drink of water. Before the herd reached the water, Muhammad blew his battle horn for the horses to return to him. Only five mares responded. Because they faithfully returned to their master, though desperate with thirst, these mares became his favorites and were called Al Khamsa, and became the legendary founders of the five "strains" of the Arabian horse. Although the Al Khamsa are generally considered fictional horses of legend, some breeders today claim the modern Bedouin Arabian actually descended from these mares. Each strain was said to be transmitted through the dam line.

Modern horses that are thought to trace all of their bloodlines to documented Bedouin strains are designated by organizations that track these lines as "Al Khamsa Arabians". Most Arabian breed registries do not maintain such designations or certify these lines.

== Strains ==
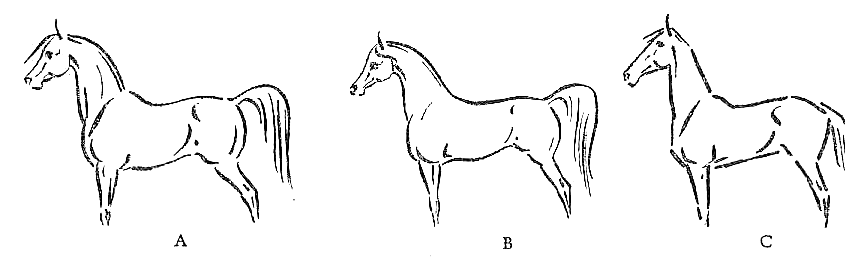
Arabian types: A: Koheilan (robust, masculine); B: Saklawi (refined, feminine); C: Muniqi (speedy).

Over time, the Bedouin developed several sub-types or strains of Arabian horse, each with unique characteristics, and traced through the maternal line only. The five primary strains, attributed to have descended from the Al Khamsa were known as the Keheilan, Seglawi, Abeyan or Obeyan, Hamdani, and Hadban or Hedban. Carl Raswan, a promoter and writer about Arabian horses from the middle of the 20th century, held the belief that there were only three strains, Kehilan, Seglawi and Muniqi or Maanagi. Raswan felt that these strains represented body "types" of the breed, with the Kehilan being "masculine", the Seglawi being "feminine" and the Muniqi being "speedy". There were also lesser strains, sub-strains, and regional variations in strain names. Purity of bloodline was very important to the Bedouin, and they also believed in telegony, believing if a mare was ever bred to a stallion of "impure" blood, the mare herself and all future offspring would be "contaminated" by the stallion and hence no longer Asil.

According to the University of Oklahoma, modern American breeders of Arabian horses generally consider Arabian morphology to fall into three categories, Saklawi and Muniqi. In Iran, five to nine strains are recognized, including the Abeya and Hamdani.

=== Koheilan ===
The Keheilan or Koheilan (Arabic: كحيلان, kuḥaylān) is described as tall and strong. The Koheilan line was widely exported to Central and Eastern Europe, as well as to Russia, where it influenced numerous breeds such as the Najd and Tersk. It had a significant influence on Polish-bred Arabians.

According to Bedouin legends described by Rzewuski, "Koheyléh" was one of the five mares who returned when Muhammad called to her. He is said to have smeared her eyes with kohl, hence the name "Koheilan".

Koheilan conformation is more solid and stocky than other strains. According to a study published in the USSR in 1989, the Koheilan type is distinguished by "prominent body mass, large size, solid construction and the ability to thrive regardless of management conditions". Koheilans show good action and stamina. It is a "male-type" lineage, with deep chest, tall stature and great power, reaching a height of 1.52 m. Koheilan symbolizes power and endurance.

There are variations in the transcription of the Arabic كحيلان: Keheilan Kehilan and Kuhailan, Kocheilan and Najdi Kocheilan, the latter transcription stemming from the origin of these horses, among the Bedouins settled in the Najd heights of central Saudi Arabia. According to Éphrem Houël, the most common French names for the line are: kahel, kahejle, kailhan, koheilan, and finally kochlani.

The lineage was documented by the Ottoman traveller Evliya Çelebi in the 17th century, who reported that in 1648–1650, the Ottoman Empire bred Koheilan (among other bloodlines) in imperial herds, and supplied them with grass, clover, and the finest grain. Among 20,000 musketeers, he cites cavalrymen riding "Kuheilan" horses.

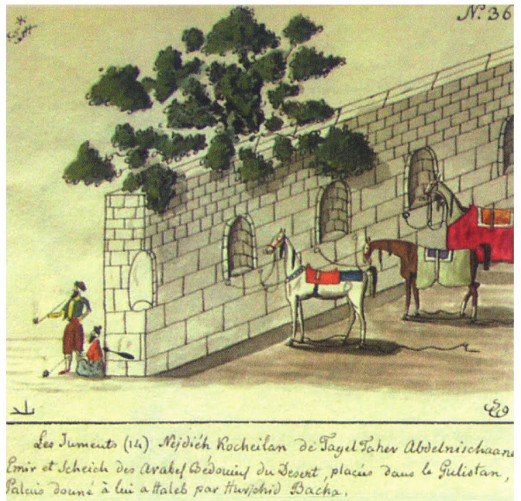
Nejdi Koheilan mares drawn by Wacław Seweryn Rzewuski

Polish count Wacław Seweryn Rzewuski in the 18th century provided a detailed description. He held the horses of the Arabian Najd in the highest esteem, and acquired them for his stud farms. wrote a treatise in French during his expedition to the Bedouins of Arabia's Najd, from 1817 to 1819. In it, he proposed a "grading table for horse blood". According to him, the hottest breed, "all blood and fire", is that of the "Bedouin Najdi Kocheilan of the Schamalieh and Hediazet deserts".

Rzewuski described the Koheilan as "unquestionably the noblest horse in the world and often even the most beautiful. His breed is the purest, the most proven. It has never been mixed". His notebook also includes numerous linguistic notes on the Arabic language, and ten pages of genealogical lists of these horses. Among other things, he writes that "these horses are Najdi because they were born in the deserts of the Najd, and Kocheilan because they have the requisite black eye qualities". He also describes Bedouin traditions of horse capture and exchange, with horses captured on caravans (nakisat) being resold to other tribes, informing them of the animals' name and breed, which Rzewuski describes as "a custom of courtesy and respect for the purity of Najdi Kocheilan blood". Defining the breed by controlling genealogy and climate, he naturally places the horses he imports and breeds himself in his stud farms at the top of the blood classification he has established.

According to Bernadette Lizet, Rzewuski specified that a hudget (a written arrestation) was attached to Koheilan horses from regions other than the Nadj, and a certificate from Nadji Koheilan, the presence of written attestations being a requirement of Russian, German and Polish importers.

Roger D. Upton (1873) believes that the Darley Arabian horse, originally from the Aleppo region, was a Koheilan-Ras-El-Fedawi However, this is a minority view and controversial, with others believing the stallion belonged to the Muniqi lineage. In the 19th century, the name "Koheilan" was given to the horses of the Syrian Desert.

Koheilan I, a grey stallion born at Bábolna National Stud in Hungary in 1922, was exported to Janów Podlaski Stud Farm in Poland, where he became the head of the Arabian racehorse line. Some of its descendants have been exported to the United States. The Bábolna National Stud favors the Koheilan trend among its Arabian half-breeds. The Hungarian Shagya breed is thus partly descended from the Koheilan IV stallion. The line was also exported to Russia, where it influenced the Tersk breed: Koheilan horses form one of the three Arabian lines most exported to this country. The line was also imported into the Shushi region, where local traditions from the 1920s still recall it, and more widely into the Republic of Artsakh, where it has influenced the local breed.

=== Saklawi ===
The Saklawi (Arabic: صقلاوي, ṣaqlāwiyy), Seglawi or Siglavy in Central Europe, was bred by the Ruwallah and Anizah tribes of the Arabian Desert. Considered a "feminine" strain, Saklawi horses are relatively small, but renowned for their beauty, finesse and endurance. Imported to Egypt and into Central Europe in the early 19th century, they have influenced several other horse breeds, in particular the Lipizzan, Shagya and Gidran.

There are many variations in the spelling of the name: Siglavy, Saglawi (in Egypt), Seglawi, Seklavi and Saklawiyah, and сиглави in Russian .

This strain is said to have been developed by Ibn el Derre of the Ruwallah tribe whose territory covers present-day Syria, northern Saudi Arabia and part of Jordan, and to be descended from Koheilat Ajuz. Prince Mehemet Ali considered the Saklawi to be the bravest of Arabian horses, believing it could fight to defend its master. It seems that Abbas I Hilmi of Egypt paid over £3,000 in the 1850s (representing between £289,300 and £10 million today) to acquire a mare of Saglawi Jedran lineage in present-day Saudi Arabia. Another source states that he acquired all the Saglawi Jedran horses from the Bedouin tribe of Anizah. In general, several written sources indicate that Saklawi horses were brought to Egypt in the 19th and 20th centuries, including Ghazieh, a Ruwallah mare too weak to cross the desert, who was transported by cart to Cairo, and Gamil-el-Kebir, ancestor of the famous Arabian stallion Dahman-el-Azrak, and its son Rabdan.

This strain is said to symbolize "beauty and elegance". A 1915 article in the Journal of Science and Practical Agriculture stated that the Saklawi is the most beautiful of the Arabian horses. The bones are finer, the head and neck more elongated than in other Arabian horses. The coat is generally bay. The lineage shows speed and endurance.

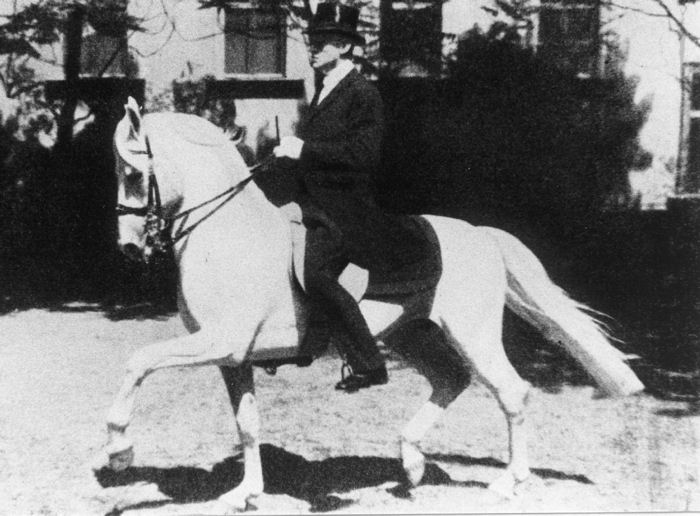
Lipizzan horse from the Spanish Riding School, from the Siglavy lineage

Saklawi horses influenced several European horse breeds. One stallion of the lineage, a gray named Siglavy, is known to have been a foundation stallion of the Lipizzan breed. He was born in 1810 and arrived in Lipica in 1814 or 1816. Of Egyptian origin, Lipizzans of Siglavy lineage remain renowned for their excellent conformation.

The Bábolna stud farm has been home to several horses of Siglavy stock. An imposing chestnut stallion, imported from Arabia in 1816 and named Gidran Senior, is at the origin of the Hungarian Gidran breed, through his son Gidran II, who began breeding in 1817. Siglavy sires are among the foundation stock of the Shagya breed. The Shagya XX stallion is notably out of a Siglavy-Bagdady mare. A third Hungarian breed, the Nonius, was crossed with Siglavy Arabians early in its development. The Borike stud farm in Croatia was home to Siglavy Arabians, the horses generally originating from the Turkish invasions.

A Siglavy can also be found among the founding lineages of the old Czech Kladruber horse. The Polish Arabian horse was formed from horses of Koheilan stock, occasionally crossed with Saklawi stallions for refinement.

== Bibliography ==
- Forbis, Judith; Ferriss, Joe (1990). Authentic Arabian bloodstock. Ansata Publications. ISBN 0-9625644-0-0.
- Hendricks, Bonnie (2007). International Encyclopedia of Horse Breeds (2nd ed.). Norman: University of Oklahoma Press. ISBN 978-0-8061-3884-8. OCLC 154690199.
- Homéric (2012). Dictionnaire amoureux du Cheval (in French). Plon - EDI8. ISBN 978-2-259-21859-7.
- Piduch, Erwin (1988). Egypt's Arab Horses: History and Cultural Heritage. Kentauros-Verlag. ISBN 3-925069-03-8.
- Porter, Valerie; Alderson, Lawrence; Hall, Stephen J. G.; Sponenberg, Dan Phillip (2016). Mason's World Encyclopedia of Livestock Breeds and Breeding (6th ed.). CAB International. p. 1107. ISBN 978-1-84593-466-8. OCLC 948839453.
- Rzewuski, Wenceslas (2002). Impressions d'Orient et d'Arabie. Un cavalier polonais chez les Bédouins (1817-1819) (in French). Paris: José Corti-Muséum national d'histoire naturelle.
- Schiele, Erika (1970). The Arab horse in Europe: history and present breeding of the pure Arab.
- Schofler, Patti (2006). Flight without Wings: The Arabian Horse And The Show World. Rowman & Littlefield. ISBN 1-4617-4892-5.
- Subhi, Hana (2017). "Voyage du comte Waclaw Seweryn Rzewuski en Arabie 1817-1819 : de la recherche des chevaux à l'intégration dans la société bédouine". Odysseys / Odyssées: Travel Narratives in French / Récits de voyage en français (in French). BRILL. ISBN 978-90-04-33472-4.
