= O'Bajan =

Arabian stallion (1880–1910)

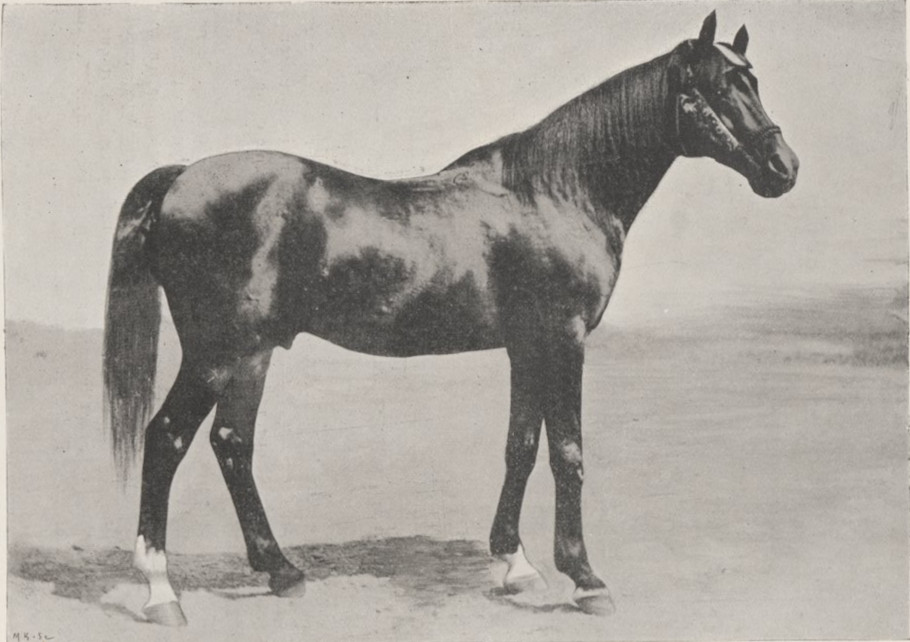
- Black and white photograph of O'Bajan at the age of 21
- Breed: Arabian horse
- Sire: Obajan
- Dam: Maneghie
- Sex: Stallion
- Foaled: 1880; Talkalakh, Ottoman Syria
- Died: 1910
- Owner: Bábolna National Stud

O'Bajan, also known as Obajan (Arabic: أوباجان; 1880–1910), was an Arabian stallion foaled in Talkalakh in Ottoman Syria. Noted for his compact build and calm temperament, he became one of the five founding sires of the Shagya horse breed.

Imported to the Austro-Hungarian state stud of Bábolna in 1885, O'Bajan served as a breeding stallion for 25 years and was regarded as one of the most influential Arabian imports to Hungary. His descendants gained recognition, including awards and a gold medal at the 1900 Exposition Universelle.

O'Bajan is buried in the honorary courtyard of the Bábolna stud, where his gravestone remains visible. His lineage continues within the Shagya breed.

== History ==
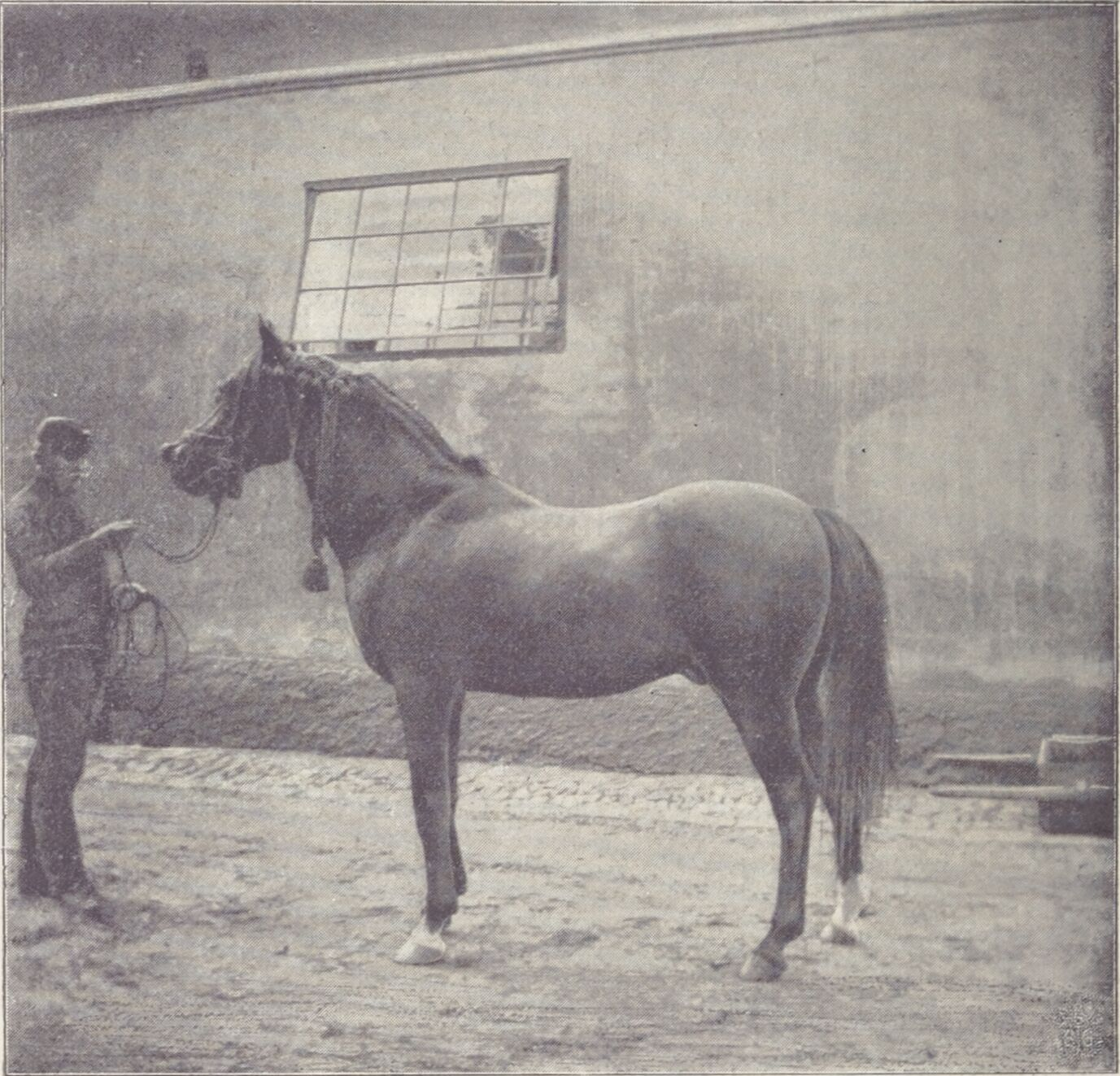
Photogravure of O'Bajan in Maurice Foäche's Notes sur l'élevage des chevaux en Autriche-Hongrie (1898)

O'Bajan was foaled in Ottoman Syria in 1880, according to most sources, although some indicate 1881 as his year of birth. He originated from Talkalakh.

=== Purchase and importation ===
O'Bajan was selected for breeding by Mihály Fadlallah el Hedad, commander of the Bábolna stud, who acquired him from the Denedzik Bedouin tribe. According to the explorer Guillaume Capus, the purchase price was 40,000 florins, although his gravestone records a price of 6,000 francs.

=== Breeding career at Bábolna ===
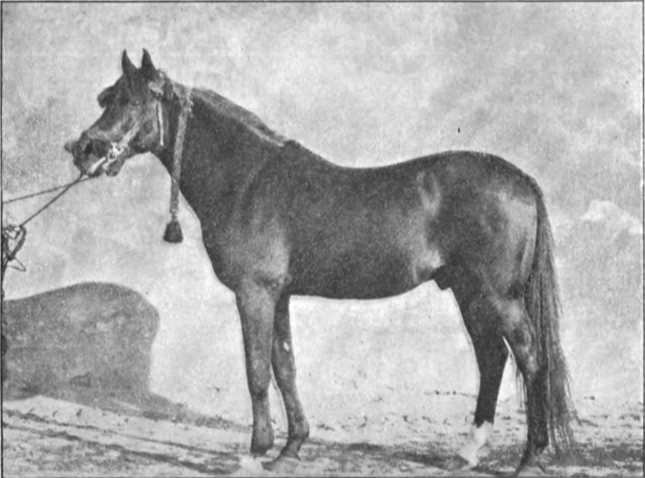
O'Bajan, as depicted in a 1896 Swedish book

Erika Schiele regarded O'Bajan as one of the most distinguished stallions ever imported into Hungary. The Swedish writer J. Mannerheim described him as the most valuable sire at the Bábolna stud during his visit in 1893–1894.

In 1892, Count Wrangel noted that O'Bajan was the only purebred Arabian stallion at Bábolna, describing him as a horse "to fall in love with." By 1894, O'Bajan was one of five breeding stallions at the stud, alongside Djingiskhan, Gazlan I, Gazlan-Shagya, and Shagya X.

Baron Maurice-Adrien Foäche, a French cavalry officer born in 1857, included O'Bajan in his assessments of stallions during a visit to the Bábolna stud in 1898. In 1901, S.-F. Touchstone described O'Bajan as morphologically perfect, despite his advanced age:

The old O'Bajan, who arrived at Bábolna in 1885 and will soon enter his twenty-first year, has the noble bearing of a true patriarch; it is especially to him that the modern Bábolna breed owes much of its improvement. [...] Seeing him, one understands the services he has rendered; rarely has an imported Arabian been chosen so successfully.

— S.-F. Touchstone, L'Élevage officiel en Autriche-Hongrie (Official Breeding in Austria-Hungary)

O'Bajan bred for 25 years and died at the age of 30. In 1912, the German Agricultural Society published the following notice:

O'Bajan ist im Vorjahr eingegangen. Dieser Hengst hat Bábolna enorm genügt. Immer und immer wieder findet man seinen Namen, und sein Blut wird noch lange nachwirken. Er gab viele gute Töchter und Söhne.

— Erich Vielhaad, Arbeiten der Deutschen Landwirtschafts-Gesellschaft

O'Bajan died the previous year. This stallion contributed enormously to Bábolna. His name appears again and again, and his blood will continue to have a lasting effect. He sired many good daughters and sons.

— Travaux de la Deutsche Landwirtschafts-Gesellschaft (Proceedings of the Deutsche Landwirtschafts-Gesellschaft (German Agricultural Society))

== Description ==
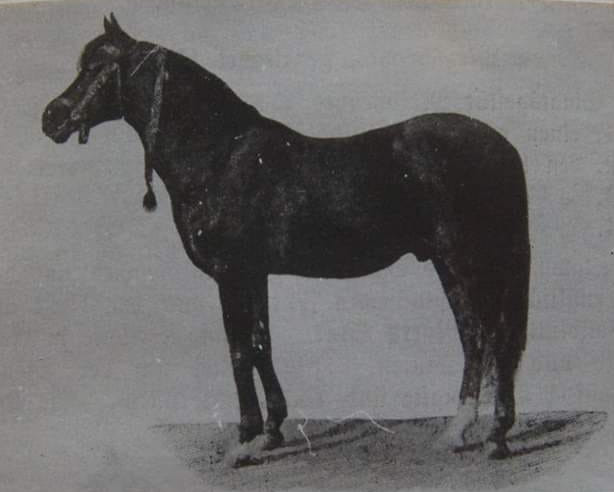
O'Bajan, from an engraving in a German book

O'Bajan was a purebred Arabian horse. According to Erich Vielhaad, he was not particularly distinguished in appearance but was noted for his hardiness and robustness. His height is reported as 1.48 meters by Maurice-Adrien Foäche in 1898, while most other sources, including J. Mannerheim who observed him in 1893, report a height of 1.54 meters.

O'Bajan had a compact conformation characterized by strong musculature and balanced proportions. His head was considered fine, noble, and expressive, featuring large, intelligent eyes and well-opened nostrils. His neck was well-developed and relatively short, contributing to a high head carriage. He possessed a sloped shoulder and a broad, low-set chest. His topline was well-formed, with a short, wide, and particularly firm back, of sufficient length to support a saddle. The stallion's hindquarters were wide, with well-rounded ribs and a strong loin connection. His hips and croup were broad and well-developed; the croup was somewhat round for an Arabian horse but remained long, full, and powerful. His limbs were muscular, well-aligned, and dry, with short, strong cannon bones. The thighs were notably deep, and the hocks broad and clean. His feet were well-formed and of good quality. The only conformational flaw noted was his slightly long pasterns, attributed to his long and supple ligaments.

O'Bajan was recognized for the quality of his skin and tissue. His coat was typically described as black, though Maurice-Adrien Foäche identified it as dark bay. Touchstone characterized O'Bajan's walk as graceful and surefooted, contributing to his noble appearance. Wrangel also commented positively on his movement.

O'Bajan was noted for his gentle and docile temperament. He was known to approach people who extended a hand, exhibiting behavior likened to that of a domestic animal. His sociable nature was evident in his tendency to interact closely with humans.

== Origins ==
O'Bajan was a member of the Saklawi lineage. His sire was O'Bajan Senior, also known as Obajan, and his dam was Maneghie or Meneghie. His sire belonged to the Anazeh el Sbaa strain, while his dam was of the Muniqi strain.

Maneghie; 1870	Obajan; 1870
	O'Bajan; 1880–1910

== Descendants ==
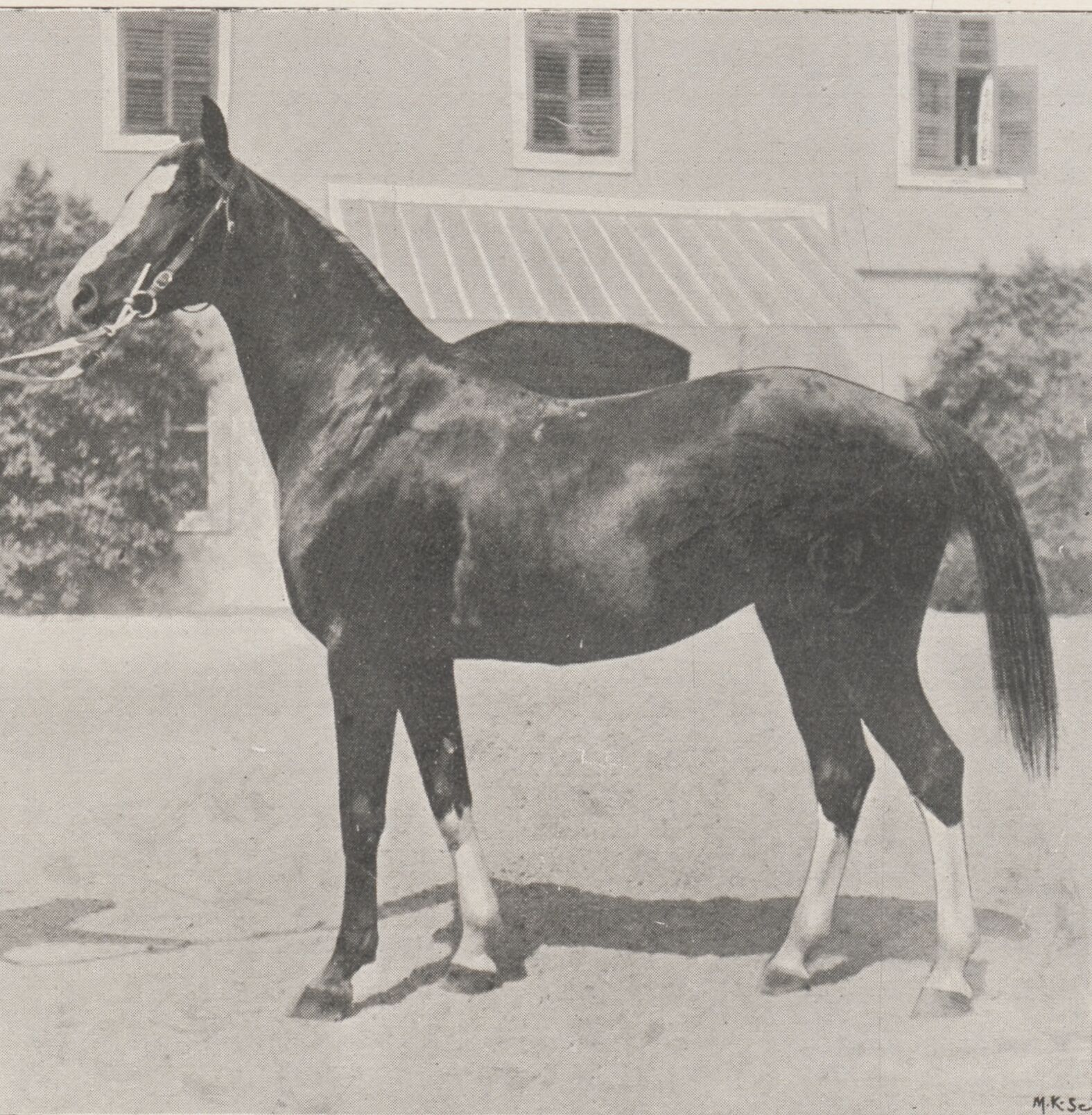
Son of O'Bajan foaled in 1896

O'Bajan is recognized as a founding sire of the Shagya breed. His success at stud led to the formation of the "O'Bajan line". Equestrian journalist Silke Behling identifies him as one of the five primary founding sires of the breed, alongside Shagya, Siglavy, Gazlan, and Dahoman. Hungarian authors Attila Alapfy and Imre Török cite him as one of the three main founding sires of the Bábolna stud, along with Shagya and Koheilane. In contrast to many other horse breeds, Arabian horses are characterized by numerous distinct bloodlines and frequent crossbreeding among them.

O'Bajan was described by Gustav Rau as a highly influential sire. He produced 312 foals, including 112 stallions and 56 broodmares. By 1911, around 20 purebred Arabian mares at the Bábolna stud were his descendants, a number comparable to those from Hamdani Semri. His offspring inherited his gentle temperament, refined morphology, excellent conformation, and increased height, with most being 6 to 10 centimeters taller than O'Bajan, according to Mannerheim and Wrangel. Their coats were predominantly dark bay or black.

=== At the 1900 exposition universelle ===
At the 1900 Exposition Universelle in Paris, O'Bajan's descendants earned notable recognition. The stallion O Bajan-8 won a prize in the junior category, while the mare O Bajan-4 took second place among Arabian mares, praised for her elegance and correct conformation. The grey stallion O Bajan-6, owned by the Austro-Hungarian imperial government and thus ineligible for competition, received a special gold medal, the highest honor in the purebred Arabian horse category.

=== Evolution and dispersion of the O'Bajan line ===
By 1896, O'Bajan's descendants were present at the Sarajevo and Zweibrücken studs. At Zweibrücken, one of his sons, a stallion standing 1.46 m, was acquired in 1890 and served as the primary sire from 1898 to 1903. In the 1920s, the Kladruby nad Labem national stud also maintained Oriental mares from the O'Bajan lineage.

O'Bajan III, a chestnut stallion foaled in 1907 from a linebreeding cross, was exported to Goražde, Bosnia and Herzegovina, where he was named. His most influential offspring was the dark bay O'Bajan V, standing 1.64 m, who sired O'Bajan VI, a bay stallion foaled in 1908. O'Bajan VI became a foundational sire in the 1920s and produced O'Bajan VII, a grey stallion foaled in 1923, considered the leading stallion at the Bábolna stud during his era. O'Bajan VII's son, O'Bajan VIII, also grey and foaled in 1933, was evacuated to Bavaria in 1944 during World War II and captured by American forces in 1945 as a war trophy; he did not breed in the United States. O'Bajan XIII, foaled in 1949, succeeded him at Bábolna and was regarded as the stud's premier stallion, nicknamed "the Black Pearl of Hungary". The lineage faced near extinction in the 1980s. The Knie Circus owned Shagya horses, including Badan, the only son of O'Bajan XIII, which performed until retiring at age 22 in Switzerland. Badan later returned to Bábolna for breeding through efforts by the Internationale Shagya-Araber Gesellschaft, preserving the lineage. The O'Bajan line persists, notably through O'Bajan XXV, a stallion foaled in 1986 in Waabs, Germany.

O'Bajan was the grandsire of Koheilan IV, a prominent purebred Arabian stallion bred through selective breeding at the Bábolna stud.

O'Bajan; 1880–1910
47 O'Bajan; 1887	O'Bajan II; 1888	22 O'Bajan; 1888	25 O'Bajan; 1888	14 O'Bajan; 1888	Jung O'Bajan; 1889	Fatme; 1889	1 O'Bajan; 1889	O'Bajan II; 1891	35 O'Bajan; 1891	41 O'Bajan; 1892	O'Bajan V 1894	Obajan; 1896	124 O'Bajan; 1898	Eiszapfen; 1899	O'Bajan; 1899	O'Bajan III; 1907	Koheilau IX	Vesta
Gazal; 1898	Shagya XV; 1899	Amurath II 35; 1907	Koheilau IX	O'Bajan VI; 1908	Koheilan IV; 1904

His descendants also included Anglo-Arabians, such as the mare Vesta, foaled from a Thoroughbred dam sired by Hermit.

== Tributes ==
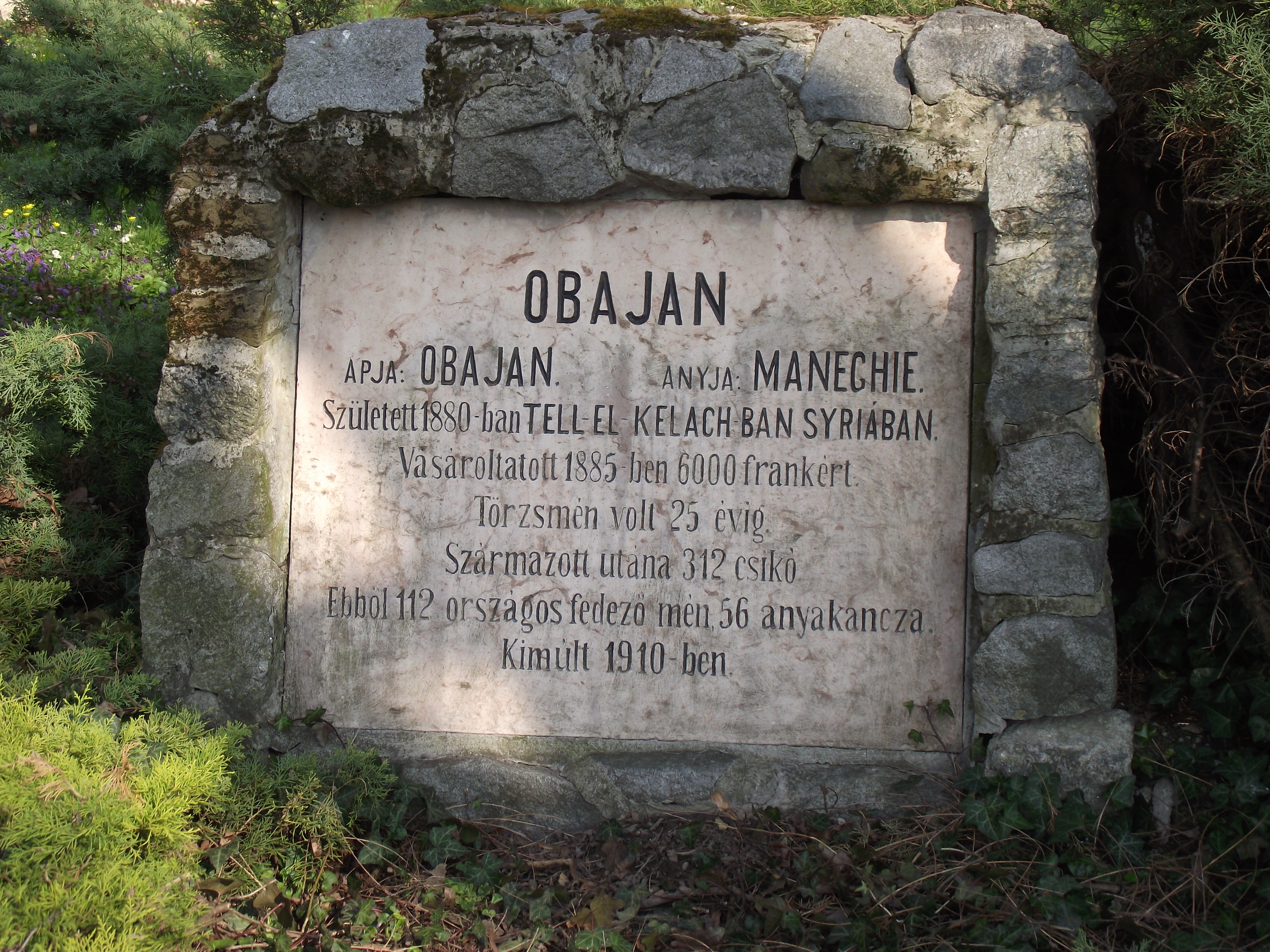
Funerary stele of O'Bajan

O'Bajan was honored with a statue during his lifetime and, after his death, was buried in the honor courtyard of the Bábolna stud under an ancient acacia tree. His grave continues to attract regular visitors. This is his commemorative grave marker:

OBAJAN

SIRE: OBAJAN. DAM: MANEGHIE.

Born in 1880 at TELL-EL-KELACH in SYRIA.

Purchased in 1885 for 6,000 francs

Stood at stud for 25 years

Sired 312 foals

Of these, 112 were national breeding stallions and 56 were broodmares.

Died in 1910

== See also ==
- Shagya Arabian

== Bibliography ==
- Alapfy, Attila; Török, Imre (1971). Du cheval arabe au cheval hongrois [From the Arabian to the Hungarian horse] (in French). Librairie des Champs Elysées.
- Foäche, Maurice Adrien (1898). Notes sur l'élevage des chevaux en Autriche-Hongrie [Notes on horse breeding in Austria-Hungary] (in French). Paris: H. Charles-Lavauzelle.
- Lehndorff, Siegfried (1982). Ein Leben mit Pferden [A life with horses] (in German). Olms. ISBN 3-487-08126-1.
- Mannerheim, J (1896). Berättelse till Landtbruksstyrelsen öfver en år 1893-94 med statsunderstöd företagen resa i utlandet för studier i husdjursafvel [Report to the Board of Agriculture on a government-subsidized trip abroad in 1893-94 to study animal breeding] (in Swedish). O.W. Backman.
- Mohammed-Ziegler, Ildikó; Gornic, Shasa (2010). The majestic black stallion: A one hundred year legacy. American Shagya Arabian Verband.
- Schiele, Erika (1967). Araber in Europa: Geschichte und Zucht des edlen arabischen Pferdes [The Arab Horse in Europe: History and Present Breeding of the Pure Arab] (in German). Munich: BLV Bayerischer Landwirtschaftsverlag. ISBN 3405107768.
  - Schiele, Erika (1970). The Arab Horse in Europe: History and Present Breeding of the Pure Arab. Harrap. ISBN 9780245596995.
- Touchstone, S. F. (1901). L'Élevage officiel en Autriche-Hongrie [Official breeding in Austria-Hungary] (in French). Paris: Adolphe Legoupy. pp. 142–149.
- Vielhaad, Erich (1912). Arbeiten der Deutschen Landwirtschafts-Gesellschaft [Arbeiten der Deutschen Landwirtschafts-Gesellschaft] (in German). Berlin: Gesellschaft.

=== Studies ===
- Michaelis, Eva (2019). Analysis of Arabian stallion lines with Y chromosomal markers (PDF). University of Vienna.
- Tunklová, Eva (2008). Uplatnění Shagya-araba v České republice [Shagya-arab breeding application in the Czech Republic] (Thesis) (in Spanish). University of the Southern Czech Republic in Česky Budějovice, Faculty of Agriculture.

=== Press article ===
- Ryder, Thomas (1984). "Babolna... home of the Arabian Horse in Hungary". The Carriage Journal. 22 (1): 30–32.
