= Part-Arabian =

Breed of horse

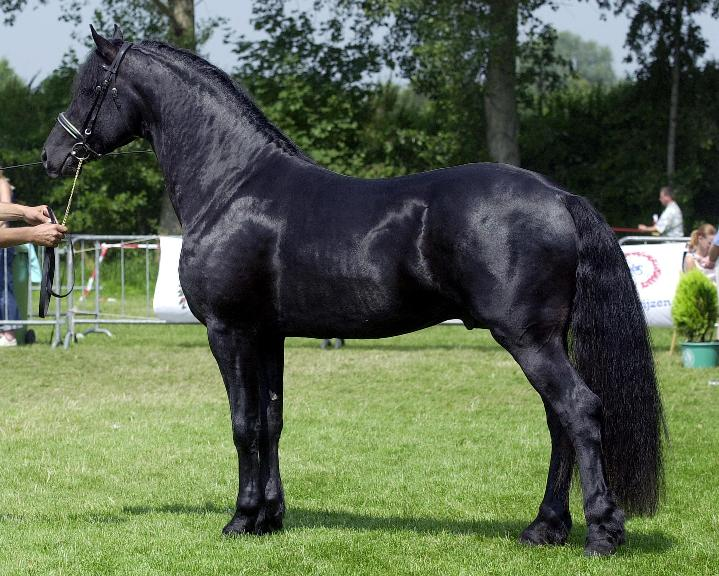
Part-Arabian, part-Friesian cross

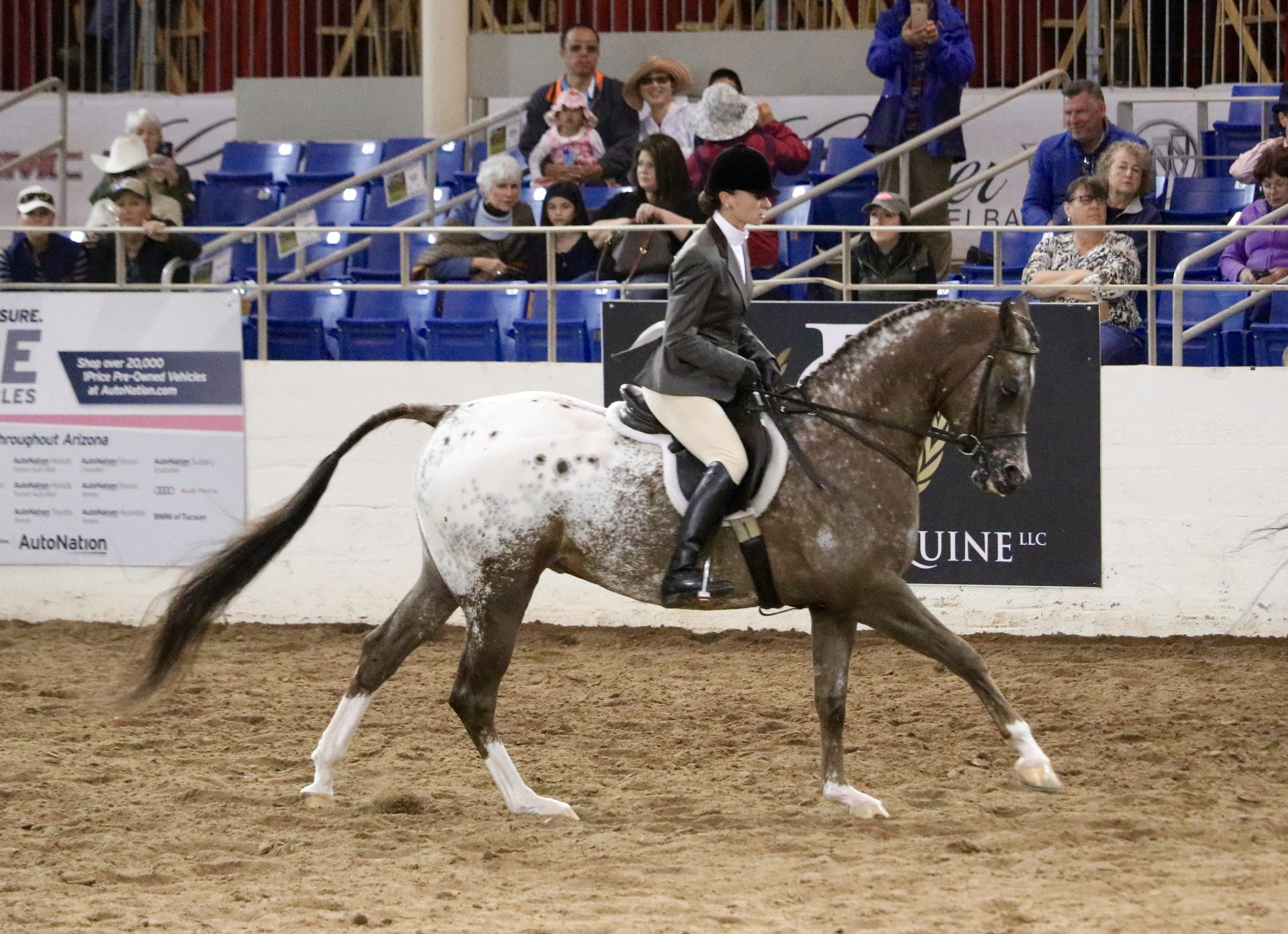
Araloosa cross

A part-Arabian, partbred Arabian or, less precisely, half-Arabian, is a horse with documented amounts of Arabian horse breeding but not a purebred. Because the Arabian is deemed to be a breed of purebred horse dating back many centuries, the modern breed registries recognized by the World Arabian Horse Organization generally have tightly closed stud books which exclude a horse from registration if it is found to contain any outside blood. However, Arabian breeding has also been used for centuries to add useful traits to countless other horse breeds. In the modern era, crossbreeding has been popular to combine the best traits of two different breeds, such as color, size, or ability to specialize in a particular equestrian discipline.

Thus, in the modern era, the desire to recognize and acknowledge Arabian breeding in non-purebred horses has led to the formation of partbred sections in many purebred Arabian registries in order to record the pedigrees of crossbreds. Some registries, particularly those for sport horses and various warmbloods, have an open or partially open stud book that still allows some infusions of Arabian blood as well as that of other breeds, sometimes based on a documented Arabian pedigree, sometimes on a pedigree plus a studbook selection process. In addition, some particularly successful or popular designer crossbreds created their own registries, some now closed to most outside breeding, though generally allowing additional infusions of purebred Arabian blood. Some horses may qualify for recording with more than one registry.

Some breeds, such as the Thoroughbred, acknowledge Arabian ancestry with named, documented horses in their stud books, but no longer accept new infusions of Arabian blood and the breed is considered a purebred in its own right. Literally hundreds of horse breeds have some evidence of Arabian influence. In some breeds, such as the Percheron, Arabian influence is considered highly probable, but dates back hundreds of years and thus is difficult to conclusively prove as pedigree records cannot be linked to individual animals. In other breeds, such as the Andalusian horse or the American Quarter Horse, documentation of Arabian bloodlines in the breed can be found but either the records are controversial, or the infusion of Arab blood itself was controversial and for various reasons the breed registry today seeks to downplay Arabian type or influence.

== Registries ==
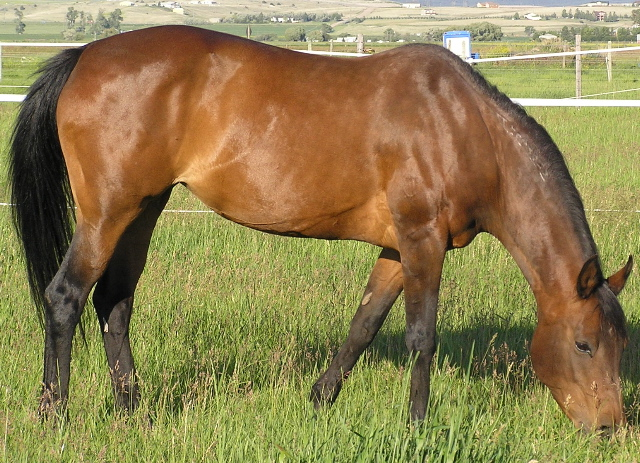
A mare of 3/4 Arabian breeding, registered in the United States as a half-Arabian

Breed registries for part-Arabians include:

- The USA Arabian Horse Association's Half-Arabian and Anglo-Arabian registry: Half-Arabians must have at least 50% Arabian blood and one purebred Arabian parent. Half-Arabians cannot be crossed on other Half-Arabians and produce registerable offspring. Anglo-Arabians have different requirements (see below).
- Anglo-Arabian or Anglo Arab: A Thoroughbred-Arabian cross. Different nations have different standards, but usually Anglo-Arabians must have a minimum of 25% and no more than 75% blood from each breed, which may be done by a first generation cross of an Arabian with a Thoroughbred or by crossing two Anglo-Arabians, or by crossing an Anglo-Arabian on either a purebred Thoroughbred or Arabian. In some nations, partbred Arabians are called "Anglo-Arabians", even if they are not strictly an Arab-Thoroughbred cross
- AraAppaloosa: An Appaloosa-Arabian cross
- Morab: A Morgan-Arabian cross
- National Show Horse: An American Saddlebred-Arabian cross
- Pintabian: A horse with over 99% Arabian blood and tobiano coloration; Pintabian horses with a registered Arabian parent also qualify for registration as Half-Arabians
- Pony of the Americas: A cross between a Shetland Pony, Appaloosa and Arabian
- Quarab: An American Quarter Horse-Arabian cross, a few American Paint Horse bloodlines are also found in this breed.
- Welara: A Welsh pony-Arabian cross.

== Open stud books ==
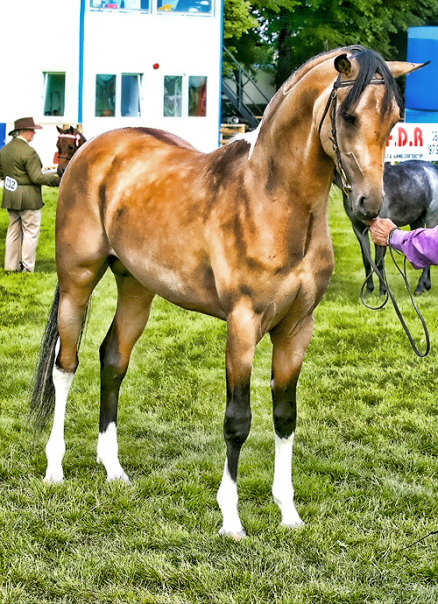
Part-Arabians may have coat colors not found in purebred Arabians, such as this "bay champagne" part-Arab

Horse registries with an open stud book that allow Arabian and part-Arabians as well as other breeds to be registered include:

- American Warmblood: Has an open stud book that allows some Arabians and part-Arabians via a studbook selection process.
- Oldenburg horse: Has an open stud book that allows some Arabians and part-Arabians via a studbook selection process.
- Palomino Horse Breeders of America: A color breed registry that accepts horses of palomino color, including part-Arabians and even the occasional chestnut purebred Arabian with flaxen mane and tail if a light enough chestnut to meet the registry standard. (Purebred Arabians do not carry the creme gene that produces a true genetic palomino.)
- Pinto Horse Association of America: An American color breed registry for parti-colored horses that accepts part-Arabians with pinto color patterns and a few purebreds if they strongly exhibit the sabino color pattern that is known to exist in purebreds.
- Selle Français: A French breed with significant Arabian, Anglo-Arabian and Thoroughbred influence.

== Partially open stud books that allow Arab breeding ==
Breeds with a "partially open" stud book, but that still allow new infusions of Arabian breeding, some based only on documented pedigree, some requiring a pedigree and studbook selection, include:

- Appaloosa: Has some Arabians in foundation bloodlines. Allows horses with one Arabian, Thoroughbred, or American Quarter Horse parent crossed on an Appaloosa parent, so long as the ensuing foal also has leopard complex traits.
- Colorado Ranger: Similar to Appaloosa, has Arabian foundation stock.
- Gidran, or Hungarian Anglo-Arab: A Hungarian breed developed from Arabian foundation stock crossed on local horses with infusions of Arabian, Thoroughbred, Anglo-Arab and Shagya breeding. All horses of this breed are chestnut.
- Purosangue Orientale: An Italian breed developed by crossing Arabians on local horses in Sicily.
- Sardinian Anglo-Arab, Anglo-Arabo Sardo or AAS: An Italian breed with a minimum of 25% Arabian blood, developed by crossing Thoroughbred and Arabian stallions on local mares from Sardinia.
- Trakehner: Still allows infusion of Arabian, Thoroughbred, Anglo-Arabian and Shagya blood in limited circumstances.

== "Purebred" breeds with Arabian roots ==
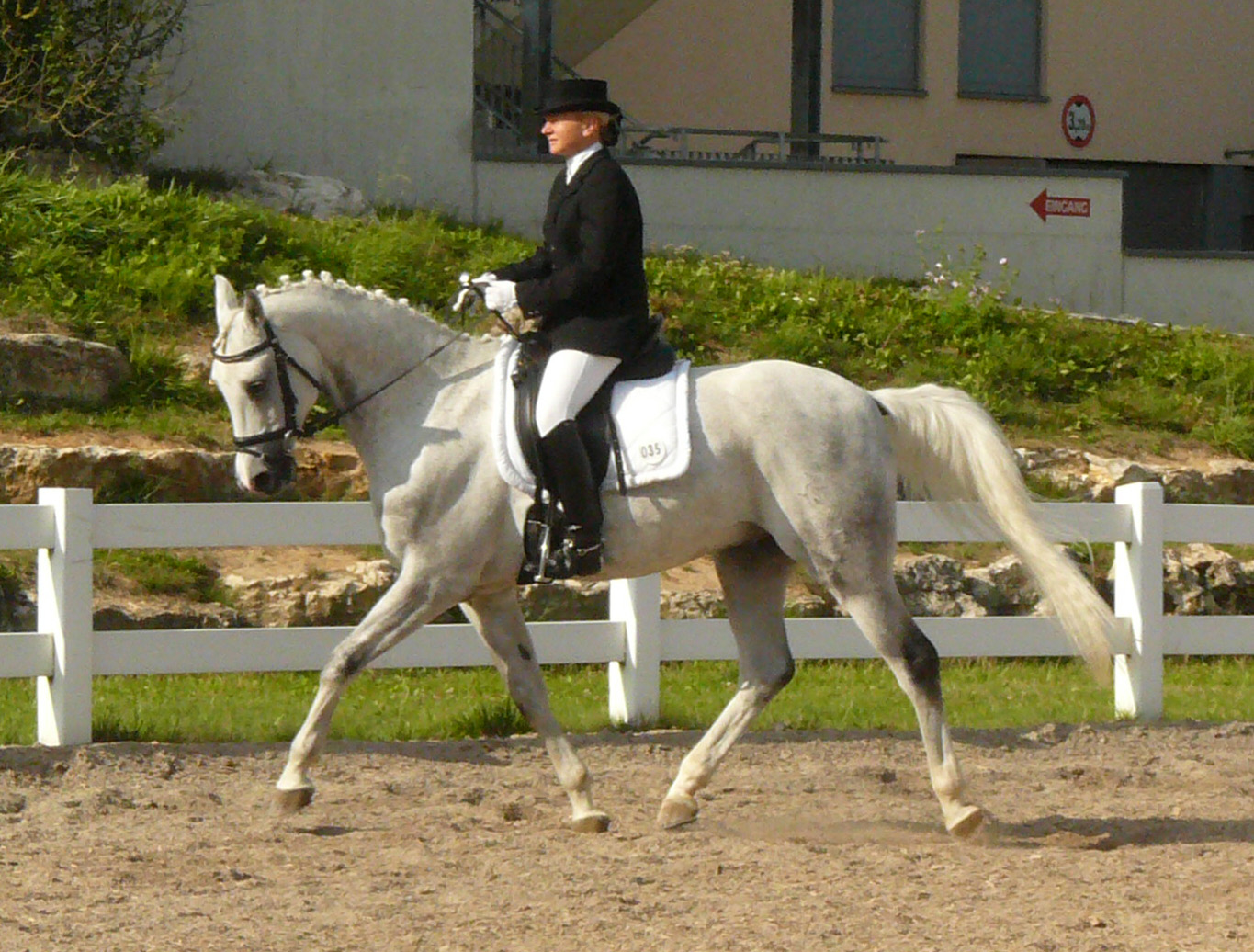
The Shagya Arabian is nearly purebred, but with a very small amount of non-Arabian breeding

Breeds significantly influenced by acknowledged, documented Arabian foundation bloodstock recorded by their breed's stud book during their formative years, but have closed stud books that no longer accept Arabian blood directly include:

- Shagya Arabian: A Hungarian horse breed that is predominantly Arabian but with a very small percentage of non-Arabian breeding.
- Thoroughbred: All Thoroughbreds today descend from one of three Arabian foundation stallions from the late 17th and early 18th centuries.
- Orlov Trotter: A Russian breed whose foundation sire was Smetanka, a purebred Arabian.
