= Kisber =

Kisber may refer to:

- Kisbér, Hungary
- Kisber (horse) (1873–1895), a Hungarian-bred thoroughbred racehorse
- Kisber Felver, sport horse breed
- Matt Kisber (born 1960), American businessman and politician
