= Welara =

Breed of horse

- Country of origin: Originally bred in England, registered in United States

Traits
- Distinguishing features: Refined but hardy pony breed

Breed standards
- American Welara Pony Registry

The Welara is a part-Arabian pony breed developed from the Arabian horse and the Welsh pony. It was originally bred in England by Lady Wentworth at the Crabbet Arabian Stud in the early 1900s from imported Arabian stallions and Welsh pony mares. Breeding then spread throughout North America. In 1981, a breed registry was formed in the United States, and a studbook began to be published. They are used for many disciplines of English riding, and are known for their refinement, hardiness and spirit.

== Breed characteristics ==
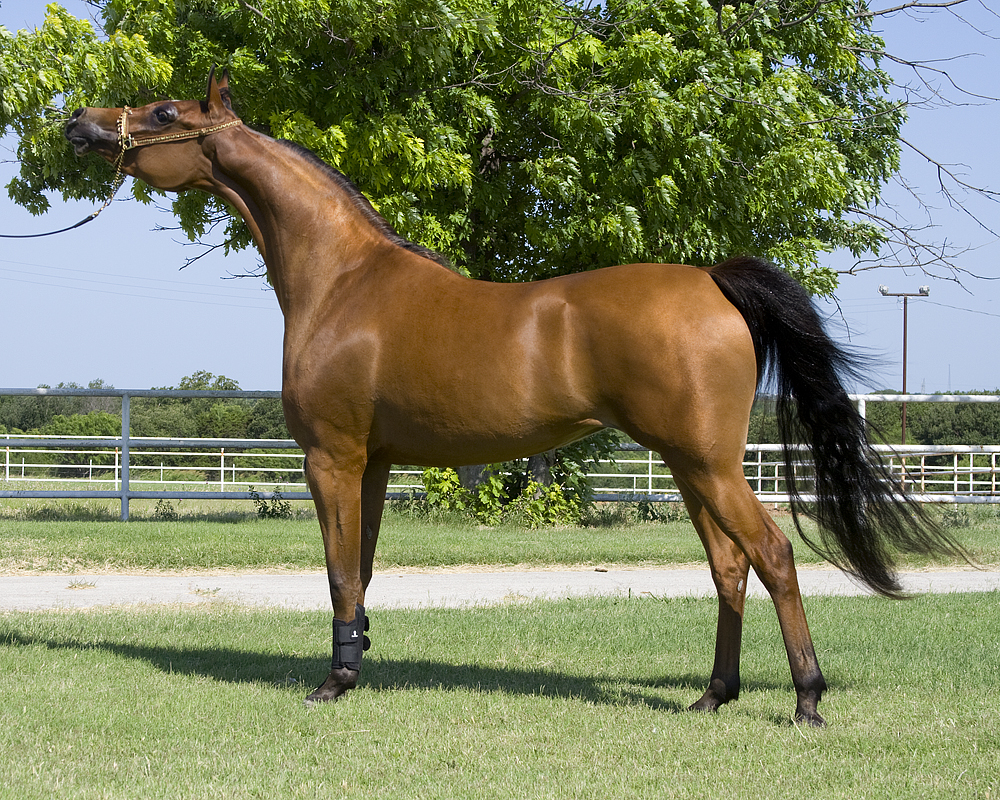
An Arabian horse

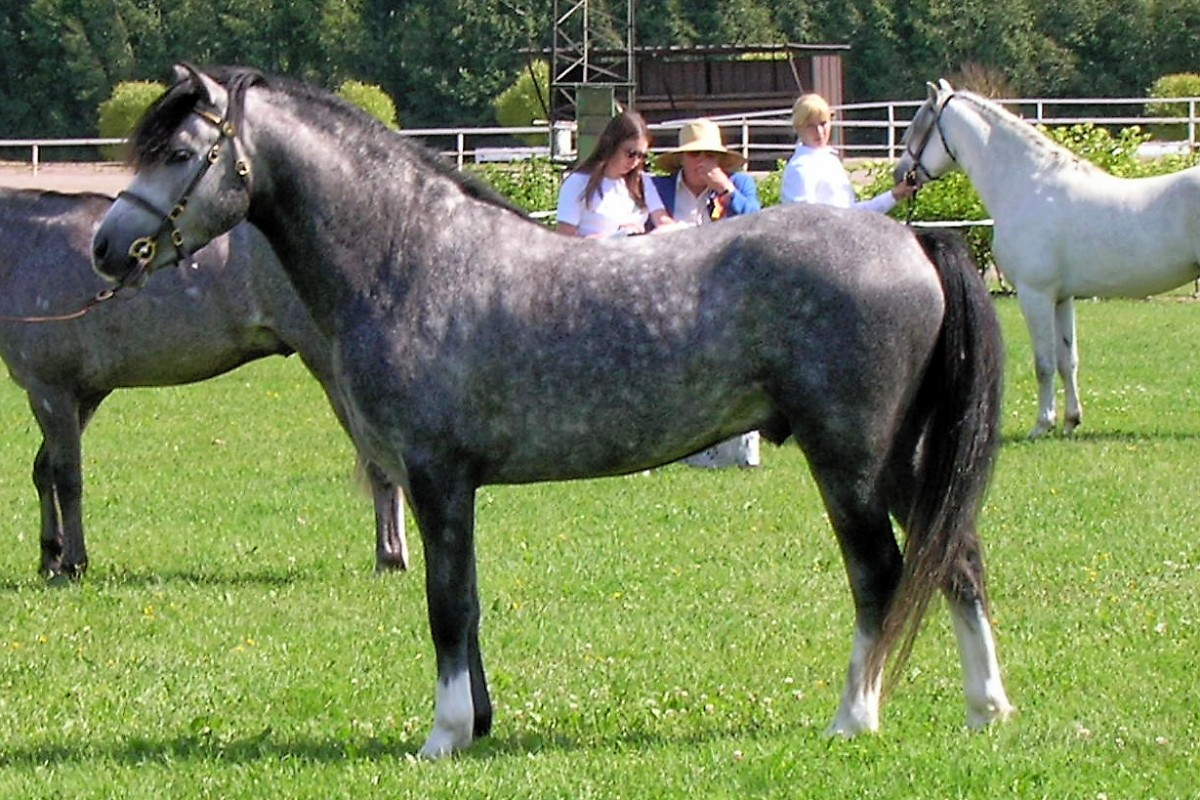
A Welsh pony

The two breeds used to create the Welara

Welara stallions average 14 to 15 hands (56 to 60 inches, 142 to 152 cm) and mares 13.1 to 14.3 hands (53 to 59 inches, 135 to 150 cm). To be registered, Welaras must stand between 11.2 and 15 hands (46 and 60 inches, 117 and 152 cm) high. Crosses between Arabians and each of the four sections of Welsh Pony (A, B, C and D) tend to produce slightly different types of pony. Section A Welsh Pony crosses (the smallest) tend to be under 13 hands (52 inches, 132 cm), and be used mainly as light driving ponies and mounts for small children. Section B crosses usually stand 13 to 13.2 hands (52 to 54 inches, 132 to 137 cm) and can be used for driving and as riding ponies for larger children and small adults. Section C crosses average 13.2 to 14.2 hands (54 to 58 inches, 137 to 147 cm) hands and tend to be a heavier pony, sometimes with feathered feet, although still showing the refinement of their Arabian ancestors. Section D crosses generally stand 13.3 to 15 hands (55 to 60 inches, 140 to 152 cm) high. The latter two types are suited to riding by average and slightly larger adults and for the majority of disciplines.

All colors other than Appaloosa are allowed for registration. Welara Sport Ponies may be of any color or size, without the restrictions of the purebred Welara. The mix of Arabian and Welsh blood gives the breed refinement, spirit and hardiness, as well as good movement. The head is small and slightly concave, the neck is arched (and prone to be cresty in stallions). The shoulders and croup are long and the back short. Welaras are used mainly in English riding, especially in hunter classes. They are also seen in show jumping, three-day eventing, pleasure driving and as general leisure riding horses. Welara/Thoroughbred crosses are popular mounts for riders competing in hunter and jumper classes.

== History ==
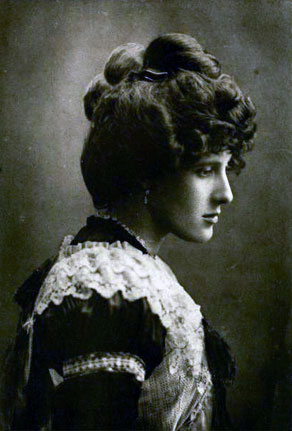
Lady Wentworth, original breeder of the Welara

Crosses began to be made between the Arabian horse and the Welsh Pony in Sussex, England the early 1900s, by Lady Wentworth of the Crabbet Arabian Stud. She began breeding Arabian stallions, including Skowronek (1909–1930), a Polish Arabian stud, to Welsh mares from North Wales, especially the Coed Coch stud farm, which she imported beginning in the early 1920s. Other breeders in England and North America soon followed suit, although at this time they were not focused on creating a new breed, and the cross became known as the Welara.

In 1981, a breed registry, called the American Welara Pony Registry, was created in the US in order to develop and promote the breed. A studbook also began to be published, and pedigrees of Welaras were collected and preserved. Only Welsh and Arabian blood is allowed for purebreds, and all registered ponies must have at least 1/8 and no more than 7/8 blood from each breed. As of 2005, the registry claimed slightly over 1,500 ponies registered in North America, with around 100 new foals registered annually. Welara Sport Ponies may also be registered – these are ponies at least 50 percent Welara but with blood from other breeds, often the Thoroughbred. The association also registers pureblood Welsh and Arabian foundation stock.

Welaras have now spread to additional areas of the world, including the Caribbean, Oceania and Europe. In Europe, Welsh/Arabian crosses, sometimes with additional Thoroughbred blood, are often called "riding ponies" or "sport ponies". In the US, the breed is seen most often in the central and western parts of the country.
