= Quarab =

Breed of horse

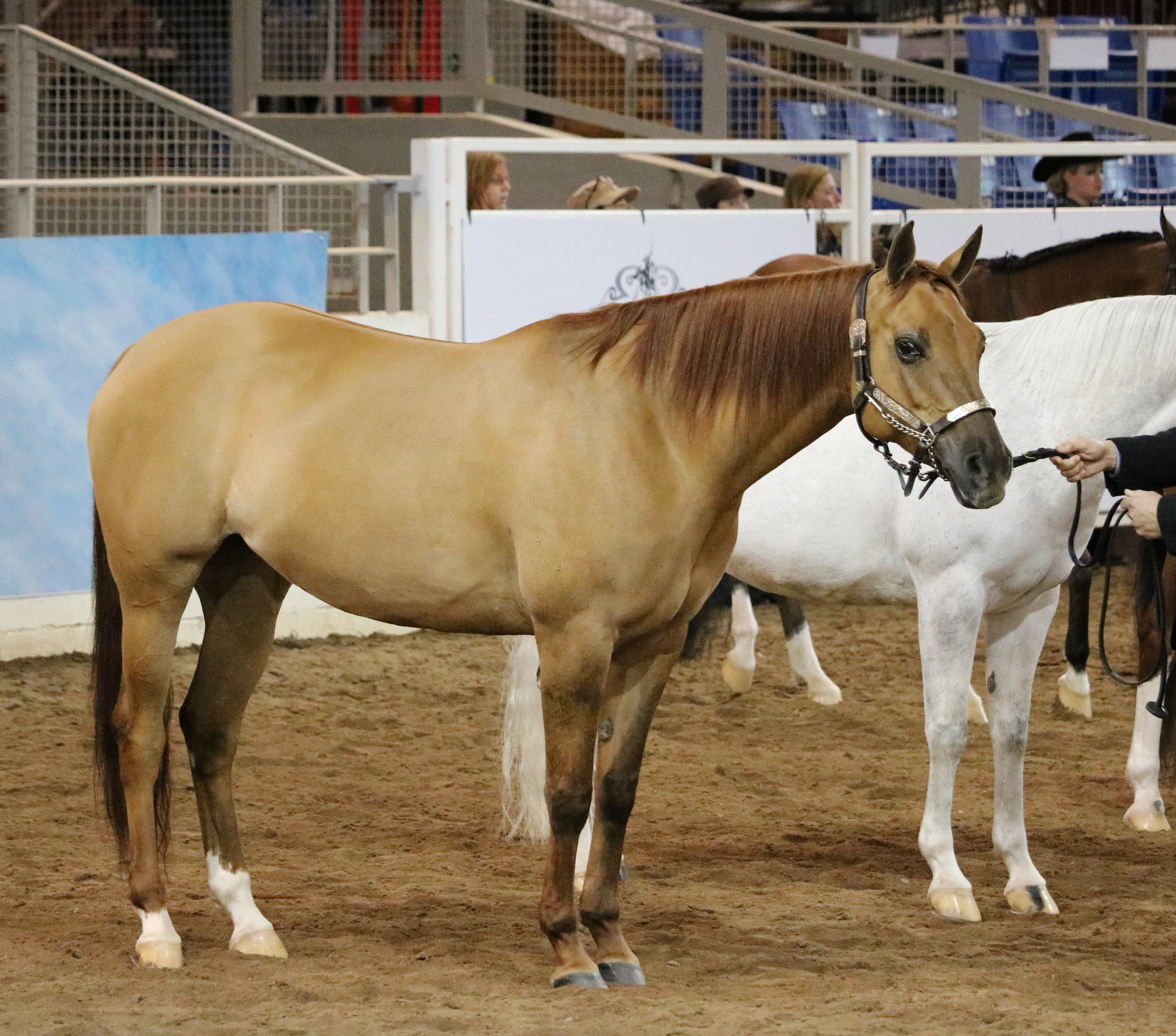
- Quarab in horse show competition
- Country of origin: United States

Breed standards
- International QuaRab Horse Association

The Quarab is a horse breed from the United States, developed from a part-Arabian cross of Arabian horses, American Quarter Horses and Paint horses. Members of the breed are found that resemble all three of the foundation breeds, leading to three recognized types: Straight or Foundation (an even cross between the Arabian and stock horse types), Stock (a heavier emphasis on stock horse breeding) and Pleasure (a heavier emphasis on Arabian breeding). Although there have been records of crosses between the three breeds throughout the history of their respective registries, the first Quarab registry was formed in 1984, but later went out of business. In 1999, the International Quarab Horse Association was formed and remains the leading force in Quarab breeding. In order to be registered with the IQHA, horses must have at least 1/8 blood from both the Arabian and stock horse types.

== Breed characteristics ==
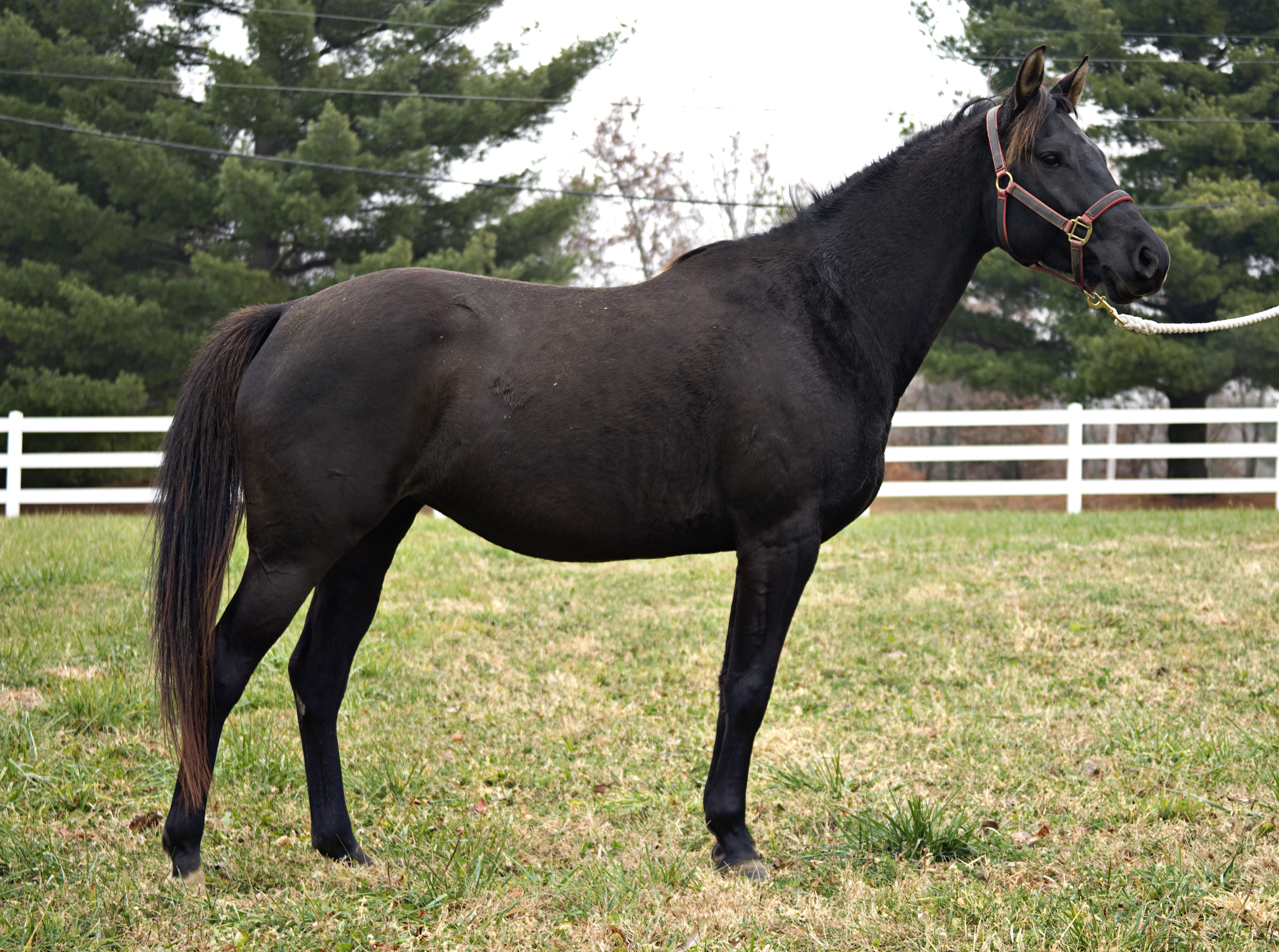
Quarab mare in early winter coat

Quarabs are found to have characteristics of both Arabian and stock horse (Quarter horse or Paint) bloodlines, with individual horses' characteristics are based on the ratio of Arabian to stock horse blood. Arabian types tend to have longer necks and barrels and level croups, while stock horse types tend to have more muscular legs and rounded croups. In height they range from 14 to 16 hands (56 to 64 inches, 142 to 163 cm). The International Quarab Horse Association accepts horses of all colors and patterns, with the exception of leopard complex spotting, which is not accepted by the registry.

There are three recognized types of Quarabs: Straight or Foundation, Stock and Pleasure. Straight/Foundation horses are an almost even blend of Arabian and stock horse traits, showing the influence of both bloodlines equally. This type is sought by most breeders, and is the type on which the registry standard is based. The Stock type Quarab has a greater amount of either Quarter or Paint horse breeding and traits; this type is often used by ranchers and Western riding breeders. The Pleasure type shows a strong Arabian influence, with less traits from the stock horse - these horses are often favored by endurance riders.

Quarabs are found competing in many sports, including Western riding disciplines such as reining and roping and English riding sports such as dressage. They are also seen in use for driving, endurance and general pleasure riding.

== History ==
Crosses between Arabians, Quarter Horses and Paints are recorded throughout the history of the Quarter Horse and Paint horse associations. For example, in the 1950s, the Arabian stallion Indraff sired two foals, a filly and a colt, by the Quarter Horse mare Cotton Girl. Both foals went on to successful careers, with the filly, named Indy Sue, earning an American Quarter Horse Association Performance Register of Merit and herself foaling three registered Quarter Horses. Before the American Paint Horse Association stud book was closed in the 1980s, a few sabino Arabian stallions were inspected and registered.

In 1984, the United Quarab Registry (UQR) was formed as the breed association for Quarter Horse/Arabian crossbred horses. In 1989, a new section of the registry, called the Painted Quarab Index, was added to include horses with blood from the American Paint Horse that showed tobiano and overo color patterns. The UQR was privately owned and later went out of business after a change of ownership. In 1999 the International Quarab Horse Association was formed to register the breed, functioning under the same guidelines as the UQR and soon spreading overseas, with member groups in Germany and the Netherlands.

The registry only accepts horses bred from parents registered with the respective breed registries - the American Quarter Horse Association, the Arabian Horse Association and the American Paint Horse Association, and horses must have at least 1/8 blood from either the Arabian or the stock (Quarter or Paint) horse parent.
