= Siglavy =

Arabian horse

- Species: Horse
- Breed: Arabian horse
- Sex: Male
- Born: 1810 or 1811; Syria
- Offspring: Siglavy III, Siglavy V, and Siglavy I

Siglavy (1810, Syria - unknown) was a gray Arabian horse who became one of the foundation sires of the Lipizzan, and Shagya Arabian breeds.

== Denomination ==
Siglavy derives his name from his Saklawi lineage, with early documentation of bloodlines referring to him as a Siglavie Ghadran.

== History ==
Siglavy was born in 1810, with a gray coat. According to Donna Landry's academic study, he was purchased in Aleppo in 1814 by Prince Charles Philippe de Schwarzenberg, along with three other Arabian horses, as part of a military procurement mission entrusted by the Habsburgs to supply their stud farms. He was acquired for a substantial sum of 3,400 florins and was likely closely guarded on his journey to Vienna, the capital of the Austrian Empire. However, some popular sources claim that he was bought in France by the Prince of Schwarzenberg.

In 1816, after being tested on his stallion abilities, Siglavy was transferred from Prince Schwarzenberg to the imperial stables at Koptschan (in present-day Slovakia).

The first evidence of his presence at the Lipica stud dates back to 1821, when he was used as a stallion to sire military horses for war and for transporting Austrian troops. Siglavy was sold in 1826.

== Recognition ==
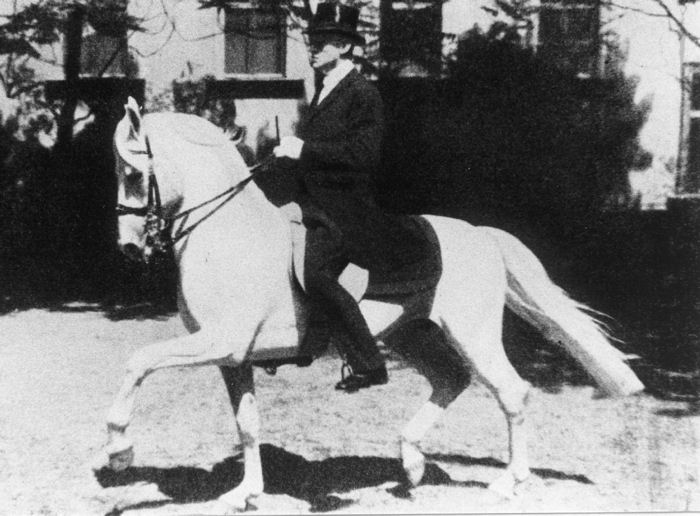
Lipizzaner horse from the Spanish Riding School, descended from the Siglavy lineage.

Siglavy is recognized as the founder of one of the six modern Lipizzan bloodline lineages. However, it took some years before his influence on the Lipizzaner breed was officially acknowledged.

Siglavy's lineage
Siglavy	Siglavy III (1817)	Siglavy XII (1833)
Siglavy	Siglavy V (1823)	Siglavy XV (1833)
Siglavy	Siglavy I (1825/1826)	94 Siglavy I (1834)

In addition to his influence on the Lipizzan breed, Siglavy also founded a lineage in the Shagya breed.

== Bibliography ==
- Landry, Donna (2019). "Habsburg Lipizzaners, English Thoroughbreds and the paradoxes of purity". Horse Breeds and Human Society, Purity, Identity and the Making of the Modern Horse. Human-Animal Studies Series. Routledge. ISBN 978-0-429-65692-7.
