= Pleven horse =

Breed of horse

Pleven
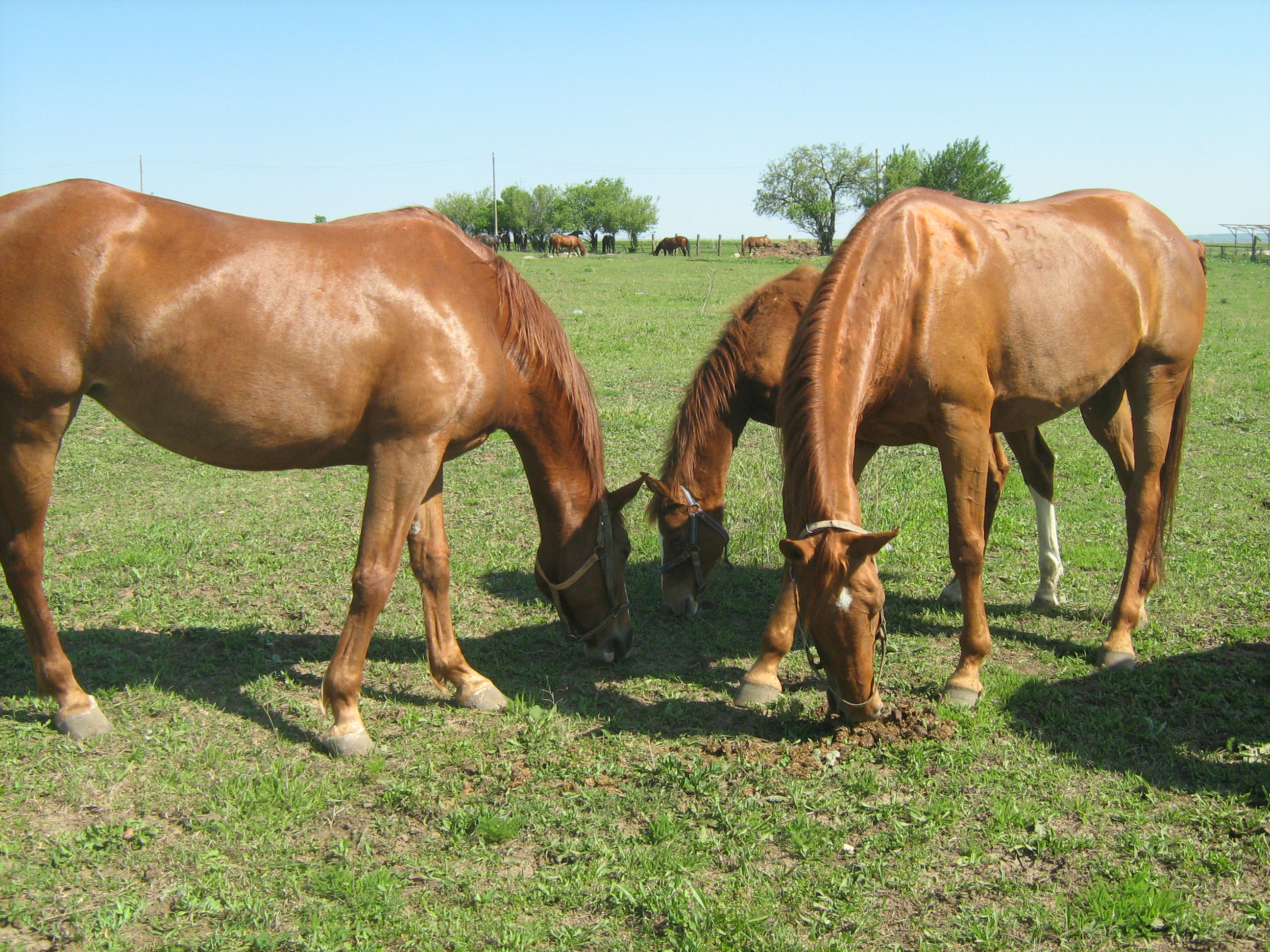
- A group of Plevens grazing
- Country of origin: Bulgaria

The Pleven breed of horse is essentially Anglo-Arabian, and the breed was officially recognized in 1951. It is a competition horse with a natural jump and has free-flowing gaits.

== Characteristics ==
The Pleven is essentially Anglo-Arabian, a cross between an Arabian horse and a Thoroughbred.

The Pleven's head has a straight profile, a long, muscular neck, and a nice topline. They are excellent movers, whose free-flowing gaits make them excel in dressage. They have fairly long backs and high withers, with quarters that are muscular, croups which are slightly sloping, and a tail that is carried well. Their legs are well-conformed and muscular, have good bone joints, well-defined tendons, and hard feet. Their temperament is calm and willing. The Pleven is usually sound, tough, and economical to feed.

Plevens are always chestnut in color, and stand at 15.2 to 16 hands high.

== History ==
The Pleven breed of horse was developed in 1898 in the Klementina stud (now called the Georgi Dimitrov Agricultural Center) in Bulgaria. Plevens are mostly Anglo-Arab, but Gidran stallions were later added to the breed. The breed was officially recognized in 1951, and English Thoroughbred blood was further added to add refinement and size to the Pleven.

The breed is still selectively bred throughout Bulgaria, and an effort is being made to increase their size, which would make it more attractive as an international sport horse.
