= Pintabian =

Breed of horse

Pintabian horse
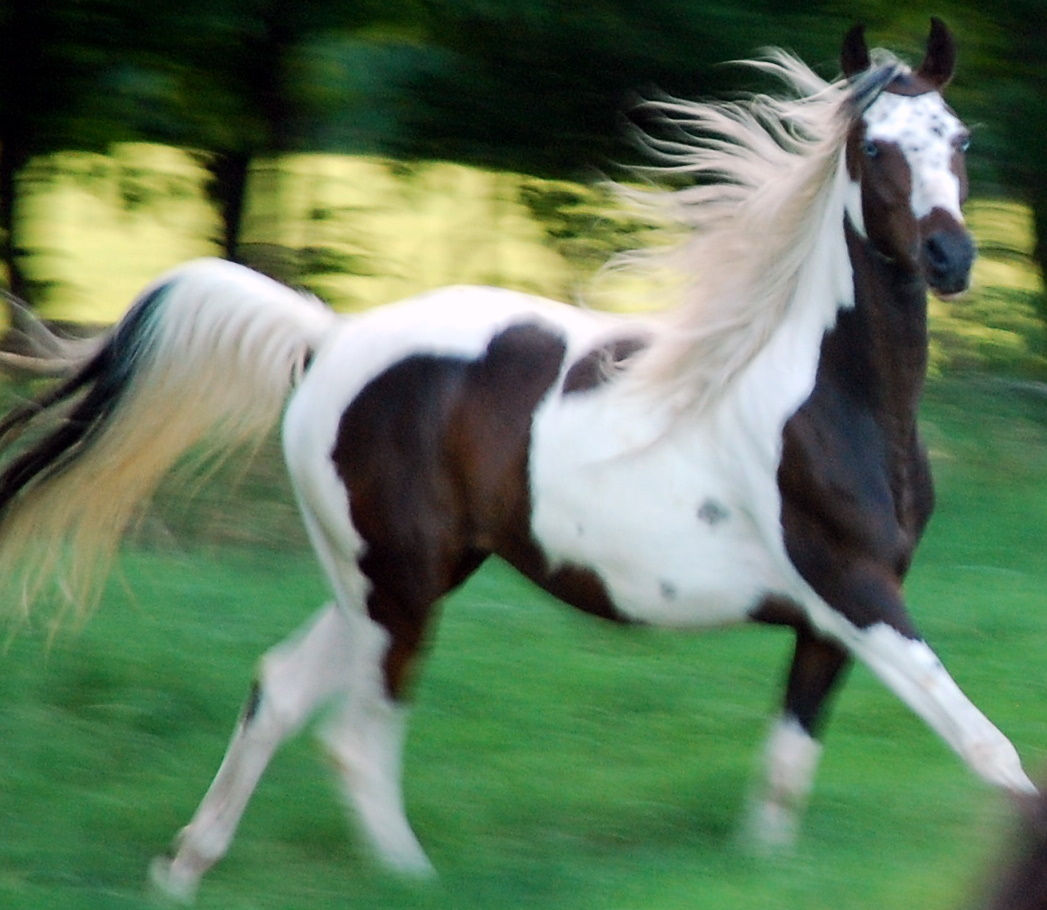
- Pintabian mare
- Country of origin: United States

Traits
- Distinguishing features: Over 99% Arabian bloodlines with tobiano coat pattern

Breed standards
- Pintabian Horse Registry

The Pintabian horse is an American part-Arabian horse breed. It has over 99% Arabian blood, but also exhibits the tobiano color pattern, which is not found in purebred Arabians. The registry began using the term "Pintabian" in 1992 and trademarked the word in 1995. which is the official registering authority for Pintabian horses worldwide.

== History ==
Foundation Pintabian horse breeders developed the breed by backcrossing tobiano horses to purebred Arabians for a minimum of seven generations until a strain of tobiano marked horses over 99% Arabian blood had been developed, at which point the breed was considered a purebred horse breed in its own right. The Pintabian Horse Registry was established in 1992.

== Characteristics ==
The conformation of Pintabian horses reflects the same ideal desired for the Arabian. The defining characteristics are their coat pattern and percentage of Arabian blood. Pintabian horses have a small muzzle with large nostrils and big, wide set eyes. Their forehead is broad with a concave face and small ears. The neck is well arched and connects smoothly to a sloping shoulder. The legs are straight with clean, flat bone and hard hooves. They have a short back with well sprung ribs and a relatively level croup with a high carried tail. They normally stand 14.2 to 15.2 hands (58 to 62 inches, 147 to 157 cm) and weigh 900 to 1,100 pounds (410 to 500 kg).

== Breed qualification and registration ==
To qualify for registration, Pintabian horses must display tobiano markings. Pintabian horses may also display Sabino or Overo characteristics and be of any base color including Dun, Gray and Cream. To register a Pintabian horse, at least one parent must be a registered Pintabian horse with tobiano markings. The other parent may be another fully registered Pintabian, a solid-colored horse with over 99% Arabian that has been recorded in the Breeding Stock Division, or a horse of "purebred Arabian heritage" registered in the Arabian Outcross Division. The resulting foal will be over 99% Arabian blood and must have tobiano markings to be registered with the Pintabian Horse Registry, Inc. as a Pintabian horse. The registry does not accept any horse for registration that is less than 99% Arabian.

A "Foundation Pintabian Horse" is an "influential" registered Pintabian listed in the Foundation Pintabian Horse Stud Book, which contains over 200 horses registered from 1992 through 2001. A "Foundation Pintabian Breeder" is the recorded breeder of any horse listed in the Foundation Pintabian Horse Stud Book.

== PartPintabian horses ==
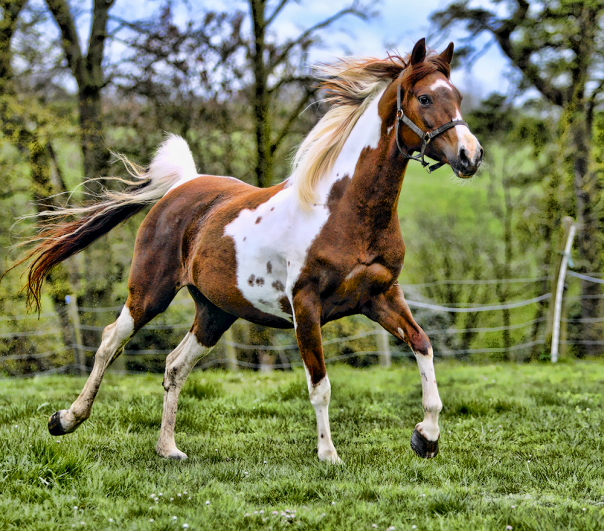
Pintabian horse

The Pintabian Horse Registry, Inc. also registers PartPintabian horses, offspring that have one Pintabian horse parent and tobiano markings. The other parent can be a horse or pony of any type or bloodline. The registry also registers non-tobiano offspring of the same type of cross as "pleasure variety equines."

A horse with pinto markings and at least 50% Arabian breeding may be eligible for registration as a "half-Arabian" with the Arabian Horse Association. Thus, Pintabian horses may be "double-registered" as both Pintabian horses and as a "half-Arabian" horses if they have one parent that is a purebred Arabian registered with the Arabian Horse Association or Canadian Arabian Horse Registry. In spite of their very high percentage of Arabian breeding, however, Pintabian horses cannot be registered as purebred Arabians.
