= Gidran =

Breed of horse

Gidran Arabian
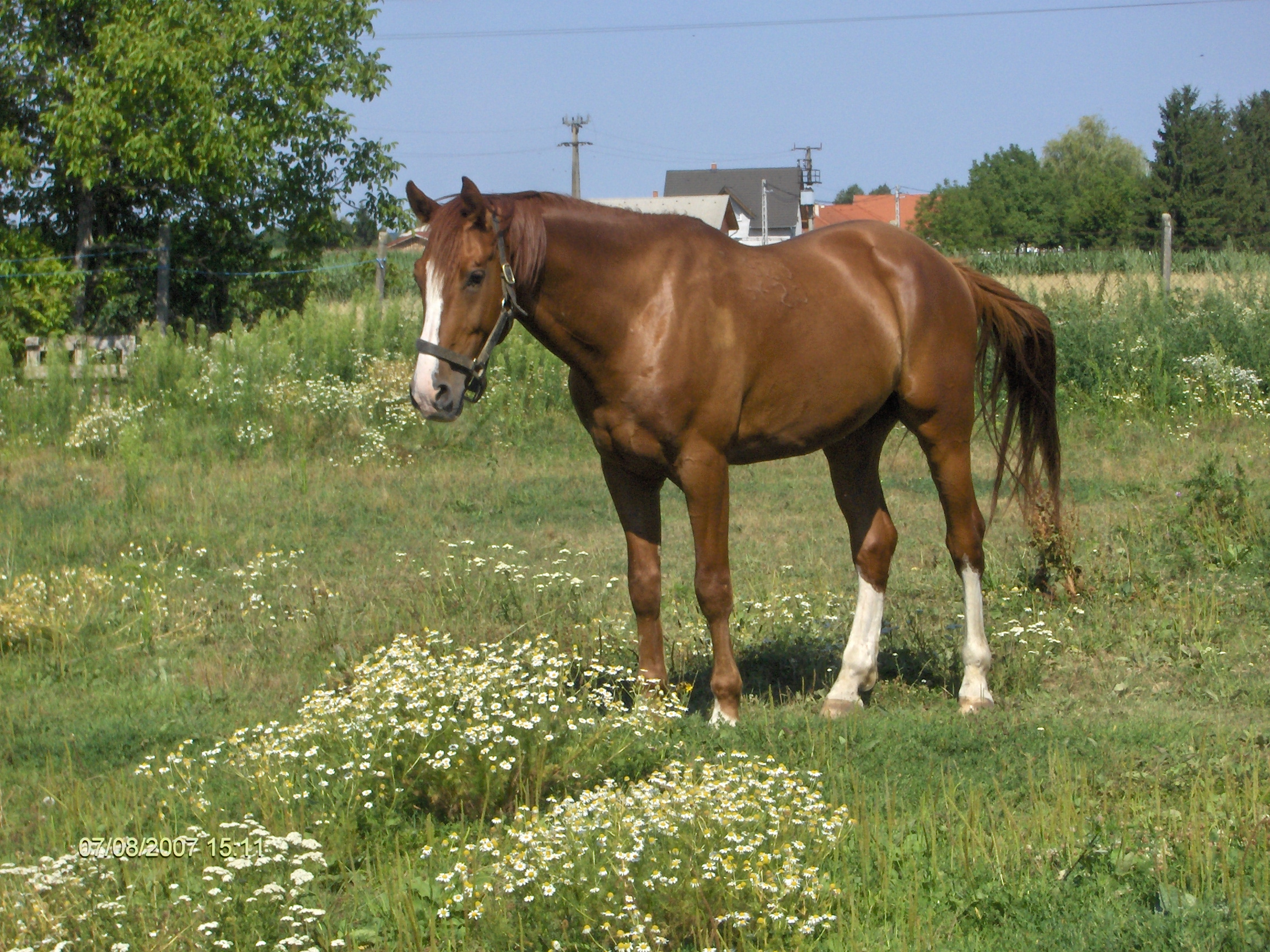
- Gidran in pasture
- Country of origin: Hungary

Traits
- Distinguishing features: Rare breed

The Gidran, Gidrán, or Hungarian Anglo-Arab is a horse breed developed in Hungary from bloodstock that included the Arabian horse. All members of the breed are Chestnut. It is an endangered breed today, with only about 200 living representatives worldwide.

The Gidran breed began its development in 1816 at the Mezohegyes State Stud. The original foundation sire was a desert bred Arabian stallion named Siglavy Gidran. This stallion was crossed on Arabian, Turkish, and Spanish-Naples mares as well as other local mares from eastern Europe. Beginning in 1893, Thoroughbred bloodlines were added. Later, Shagya Arabian breeding was also added.

The breed influenced or was crossed on many other breeds in eastern Europe, including the Czech warm blood, Austrian Warmblood, Hungarian Warmblood, Malapolski, Nonius, Pleven, and the Ukrainian Riding Horse. It is closely associated with another Hungarian breed, the Kisber Felver.

A study in 2016 of the Gidran showed that the remaining small population of horses has more genetic diversity than expected, which improves the breed's chances of not becoming extinct.

== Characteristics ==
Gidrans stand between 15.3 to 17 hands (63 to 68 inches, 160 to 173 cm). Crossbred animals that are chestnut and of Thoroughbred, Arabian, and Anglo-Arabian descent with a documented four-generation pedigree and minimum size of 15.2 hands may be added to the stud book if they qualify through a studbook selection process.

The horses are set apart for their speed, stamina, agility, and courage. They have a small head and a straight profile. They have well-shaped crest and small ears. The breed tends to have a long back and large eyes. The Gidran is a very muscular horse and is powerful.
