= Kisber Felver =

Breed of horse

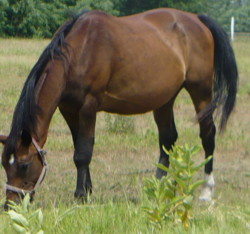
- A Kisber Felver gelding
- Other names: Kisber Horse
- Country of origin: Hungary

Traits
- Distinguishing features: Athletic build, riding/sport horses

The Kisber Felver (Hungarian: Kisbéri félvér, which means half-bred from Kisbér) is a rare sport horse breed developed at the former Kisber Stud in Hungary. The Kisber Felver is not widely known, but has merit in sport horse disciplines. Only a handful of people continue breeding Kisber Felver horses today.

== History ==
The Kisber Stud was founded in 1853, and initially bred Thoroughbreds. It successfully produced racehorses and was the origin for champions such as the unbeaten mare Kincsem, who was entered in The Guinness Book of World Records.

Through a carefully controlled breeding program, a distinct horse type evolved. The Kisber Felver was bred by crossing Thoroughbreds with Furiosos, Trakehners, Arabians, Anglo-Arabians, and Selle Français, while maintaining the a high ratio of Thoroughbred blood.

The Kisber Felver is a relatively young breed, developed over the past hundred years, and they display good conformation, athletic ability, movement, and a lively temperament. Like many other horse breeds, the Kisber Felver was endangered during the World War I and World War II. In 1945, more than half of the breeding stock were taken as war spoils. 150 Kisber Felver horses were imported for the US Remount, but were sold at public auction in 1947 when the remount disbanded. Unlike other European imports such as the Lipizzaner, the imported Kisber Felvers were widely crossbred, reducing the count of purebred animals. In 1961, the Dalmand Stud took hold of the remaining purebred Kisber Felvers. The stud has continued the breeding to the day.

== Foundation sires ==
The existing sire lines for the breed include Fenek (Buccaneer- Helen Triomphante), Filou (Gunnarsbury- Fidget), Dunure (St.Simon- Sunrise), Maxim (St.Maclaou-Crested Gable) and Honpolgar (Duncan Grey-Short Holiday). Another influential stallion was the Trakehner stallions Szeplak (Templehüter-Héldenlégende) and Formas (Lancealot xx - Foramint).

== Characteristics ==
Kisber Felvers are a sporthorse breed developed to perform in a variety of modern sport horse disciplines. They stand between 15.2 to 17 hands (62 to 68 inches, 157 to 173 cm) and can be any solid color but are often bay or chestnut. All stallions intended for breeding must be inspected and licensed by the breeding committee.
