= Shagya Arabian =

Breed of horse

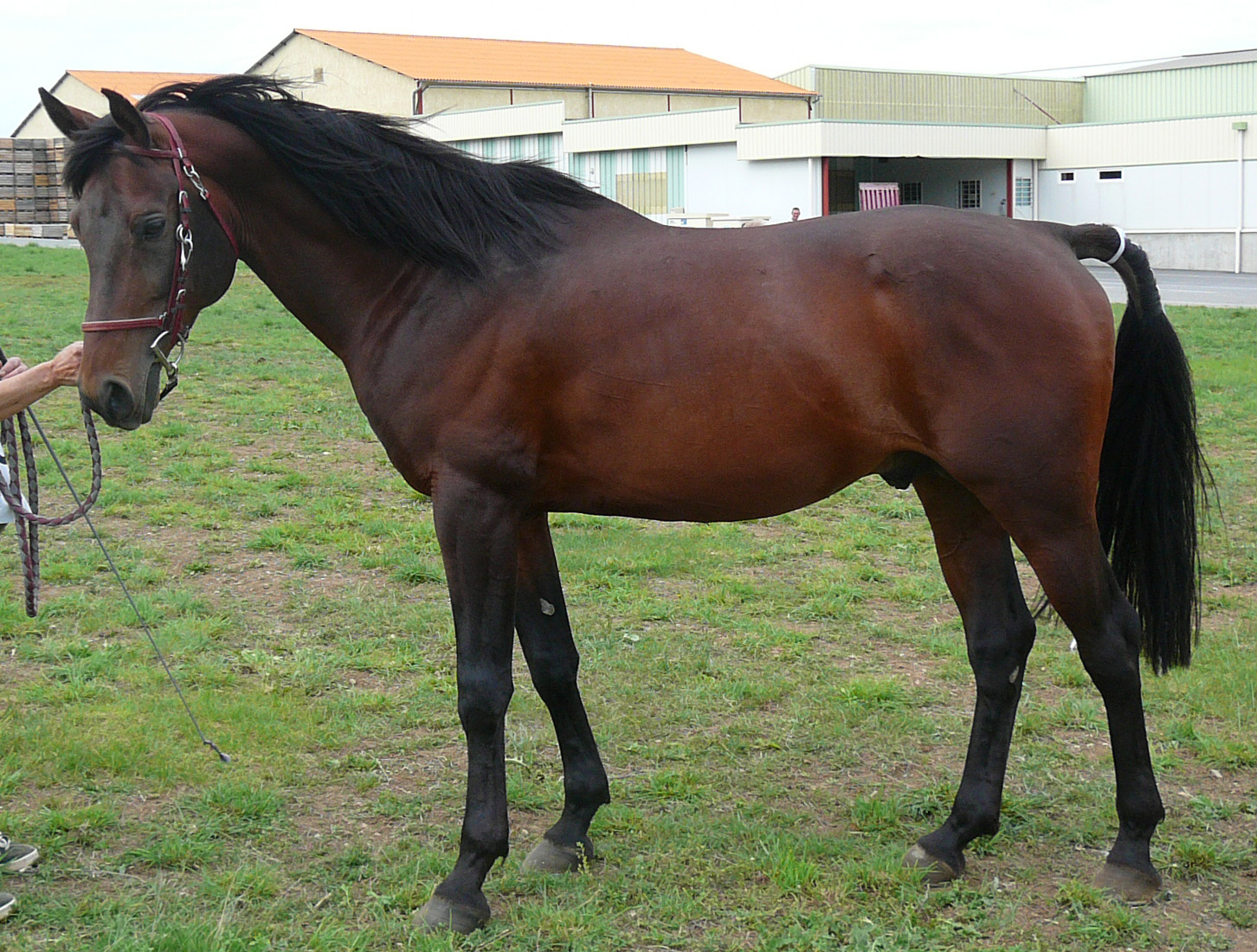

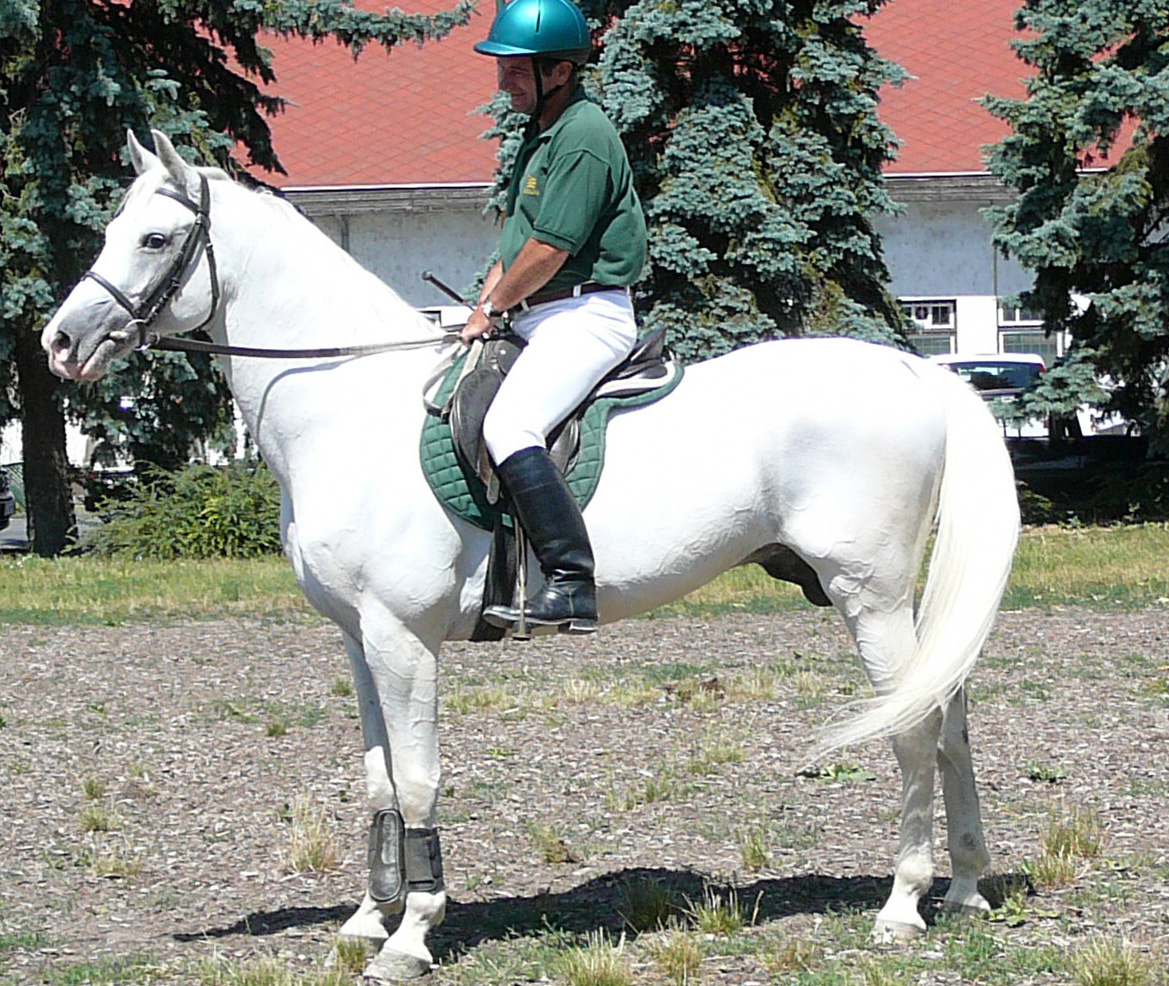
- Country of origin: Hungary, southeastern Europe

The Shagya Arabian is a horse breed which was developed in the Austro-Hungarian Empire during the 19th century at the Bábolna, Mezőhegyes, Radautz, Piber, and Topolcianky studs. Today it is most often seen in the Czech Republic, Austria, Romania, the former Yugoslavian countries, Poland, Germany, and Hungary, but has been exported to other nations and is bred around the world. A purebred Shagya Arabian today has bloodlines that can be traced in all lines to the stud books of Rădăuți, Babolna, and Topolcianky. The breed is considered by some to be a subtype of Arabian horse, but due to the presence of a small amount of non-Arabian breeding others consider it to be an Anglo-Arabian or a partbred Arabian.

== Origin ==
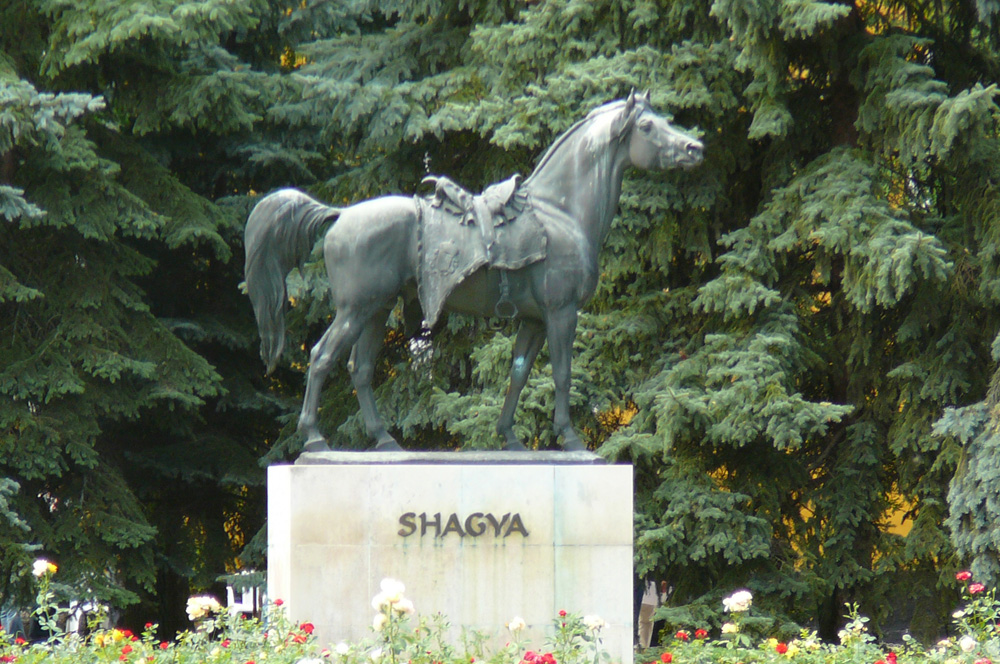
Statue of Shagya at Babolna

The breed is named for the major foundation sire Shagya, a gray Arabian stallion with some ancestors of the Kehilan and Siglavy (Seglawi) strains. Born in Syria in 1810, he was taller than the average Arabian of the time, standing 15.2^{1}/_{2} hands (62.5 inches, 159 cm) at the withers. His weight was 530 kg. He was mostly used for crossbreeding at Babolna, bred few pure-blooded or asil Arabian mares, and thus has no pure Arabian descendants today. Many of the Arabian stallions standing at Babolna and other studs were crossbred with mares who already possessed a great deal of Arabian influence due to the long Turkish occupation of Eastern Europe. Some Thoroughbreds and Lipizzans were also used. In all cases, meticulous pedigree records were kept.

Originally, these horses were referred to by the generic term Araberrasse (Arab "race" or breed, indicating predominantly Arabian ancestry) but this was changed after the second World War to Shagya by hippologist Dr. Gramazky because he was worried the non-purebred descendants of Shagya would be confused with the purebred Arabian horses that were also produced in Hungary. At the time, this name was chosen since Shagya was in virtually every pedigree as an ancestor, though many other Arabian bloodlines are also a part of the Shagya breed.

== Bloodlines ==
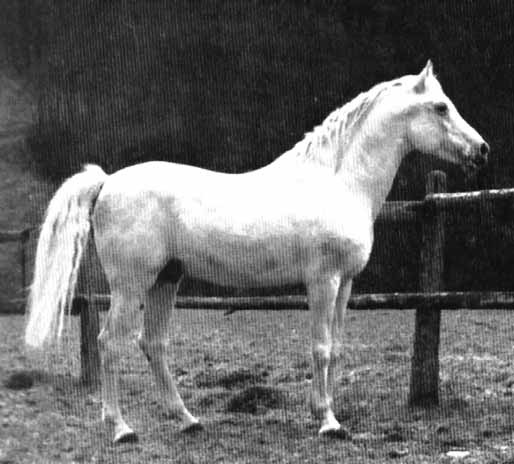
The purebred Arabian stallion Jasir, who also appears in many Shagya pedigrees. Carl Raswan photo, 1912

While Shagyas are not considered "pure" or asil Arabians, they have a closed stud book and have special status within the World Arabian Horse Organization (WAHO). In 1978, WAHO stated that Shagya Arabians that have been bred pure after the system of Babolna and Topolcianky may be termed "purebred Shagya Arabians", and the Shagya breeders' organisation is under WAHO patronage as associate members, allowed to use the WAHO emblem. However, WAHO also was clear that "purebred" in this case means that the horses have been bred pure among themselves and are not to be confused with the term "purebred Arabian". Some aficionados note that the meticulous recordkeeping of the Hungarian studs actually has produced horses with longer and more complete pedigrees than some horses accepted as purebred Arabians by mainstream registries. However, despite this argument, Shagyas remain a distinct bloodline group and are generally not accepted as pure-blooded Arabians.

== Traits ==
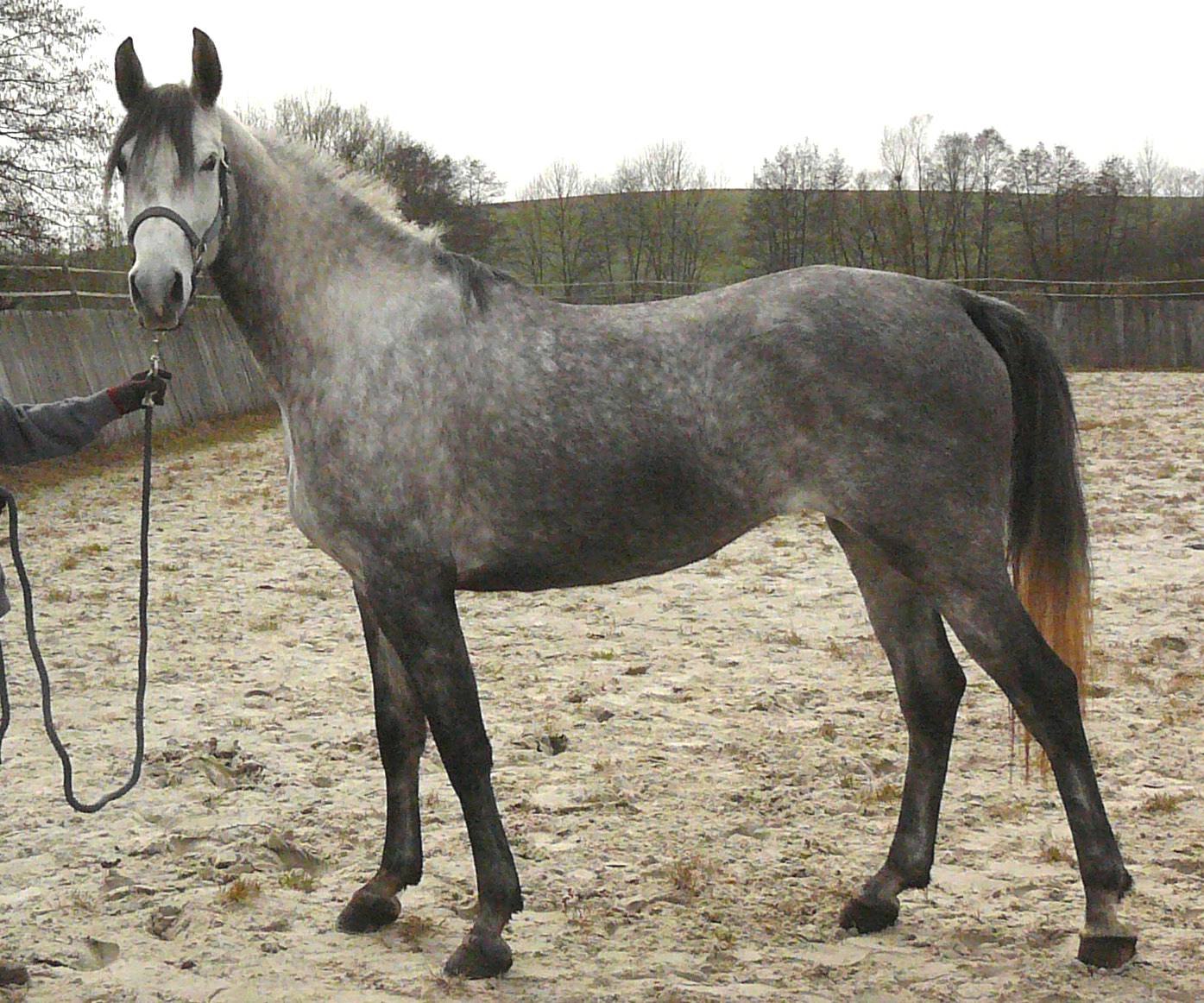
A Shagya mare

The Shagya Arabian exhibits traits similar to the asil or purebred Arabian horse, with high carried tail, sound bone and excellent endurance. However, due to the small influx of non-Arabian breeding and the breeding goals of the Hungarian studs, Shagyas tend to be taller, less refined, and bigger-boned than purebred Arabians; the modern Shagya is usually at least 15 hands tall and commonly 16 hands, whereas the breed standard for the Arabian ranges from 14.1 to 15.1 hands, with some individuals over and under that height.

== Uses ==
This breed is recognized as a riding horse, and is also driven in harness. It was a hardy cavalry horse and is now popular in disciplines such as dressage, eventing and endurance riding. The 2006 FEI Endurance World Champion was a Shagya gelding bred at Babolna.

== See also ==
- Gidran – Breed of horse
- O'Bajan – Arabian stallion (1880–1910)
