= Foundation stock =

Animals that procreate a new breed

Foundation stock or foundation bloodstock refers to animals that are the progenitors, or foundation, of a breed or of a given bloodline within such. Many modern breeds can be traced to specific, named foundation animals, but a group of animals may be referred to collectively as foundation bloodstock when one distinct population (including both landrace breeds or a group of animals linked to a deliberate and specific selective breeding program) provides part of the underlying genetic base for a new distinct population.

== Terminology ==
The terms for foundation ancestors differ by sex, most commonly "foundation sire" for the father and "foundation dam" for the mother. Depending upon the species in question, more specialized terms may be used, such as foundation mare for female horses, foundation queen for female cats, or foundation bitch for female dogs.

The offspring of genetically dissimilar parents or stock, whether of different species or different breeds are technically called hybrids. In Mendelian genetics, the foundation generation is the first set of unrelated parents ("P") to be mated to one another. A first generation hybrid descendant from these parents is called a F1 hybrid (F_{1}) or filial 1 hybrid, with subsequent generations designated F_{2} and so on.

Related concepts include:

- Founder effect - the loss of genetic variation that occurs when a new population is established by a very small number of individuals from a larger population. It is a special case of genetic drift, where subsequent generations may have less genetic variation than the original population, which leads to fixation. On one hand, fixed traits are what creates a standardized breed of animal, but if the level of inbreeding becomes significant, it can make the new population more vulnerable to extinction. Founder effect can also lead to the development of new species.
- Designer crossbred - Usually describes F1 crosses between two different animal breeds.
- Population bottleneck - when Genetic drift occurs more rapidly on account of a dramatically diminished population size.

== Dogs ==
In dog breeding, the process of becoming a standardized, officially recognized breed in the United States requires keeping meticulous records for several generations. To facilitate this process, The American Kennel Club operates a breed registry for over 60 nascent and experimental breeds, called the Foundation Stock Service Program (FSS), through which breeders can seek to establish full AKC recognition of their new breeds.

== Horses ==
In horse breeding, there are usually a much smaller number foundation sires than foundation dams. In some cases, named foundation mares are not always identified in old pedigree records at all. Conversely, in other cases, such as in Thoroughbred breeding, pedigree families are traced to the tail-female line. Breeds that require that all members trace to specific foundation stock have a closed stud book and prohibit or strongly limit crossbreeding to other animals. The Thoroughbred, Andalusian and Arabian are examples of breeds with a closed stud book.

Some breeds with an established phenotype and named foundation stock may still permit outside bloodlines, usually from the foundation breeds from which they came, to contribute further to the genetic base of the breed; these thus have at least partially open stud books. An example of a partially open stud book is that of the American Quarter Horse, which still allows limited registration of animals with one Quarter Horse parent and one Thoroughbred parent. Newer breeds, such as many of the warmblood breeds, may have mostly open stud books, where horses that are registered may be of a variety of bloodlines, but must first pass a rigorous studbook selection process.

Some breeds, such as the Morgan horse, have a single named foundation sire, while others, such as the Lipizzan, or the American Quarter Horse, may have several. In some cases, particularly with older horse breeds, some or all foundation sires may be unknown. However, in breeds with a well-documented breed registry, all or nearly all foundation animals may be identified. For example, there are three major foundation sires of the Thoroughbred, and another 24 or 25 minor foundation sires, along with 74 foundation mares. An example of a foundation bloodstock pedigree line within a breed are the Crabbet lines from the Crabbet Arabian Stud farm in England. These animals were bred by the same program for 92 years, were exported worldwide, and had a substantial impact on the breed. Some Arabian breeders today specialize in horses descended only from this breeding program. Similarly, in the Standardbred, the Clay Trotting Horses constitute a distinct foundation line within that breed.

An example of a breed formed by foundation stock from other breeds, but not necessarily all from named individual animals, is the Hackney horse, with bloodlines contributed from Thoroughbred and Norfolk Trotter. In other cases, where a breed or landrace is older than any written records, the foundation bloodstock is sometimes described by myths or legends, such as the mythical horses of Mohammad, known as Al Khamsa ("The Five"), claimed in legend as the foundation mares of the Arabian horse breed.

The word "foundation" is also sometimes applied to horses of a phenotype that resembles that of the original foundation stock, particularly when the modern look of the breed has diverged from the original stock. The word may refer to animals tracing only to a select subset of the oldest foundation bloodlines, particularly when newer breeding has been added that changed the original phenotype.
