= Khemosabi =

20th-century American Arabian showhorse and sire

Khemosabi++++//
- Khemosabi++++//
- Breed: Arabian
- Discipline: Western Pleasure; Halter
- Sire: Amerigo
- Grandsire: Ferseyn
- Dam: Jurneeka++
- Maternal grandsire: Fadjur
- Sex: Stallion
- Foaled: 1967
- Country: United States
- Color: Bay
- Breeder: Dr. Bert and Ruth Husband
- Owner: Dr. Bert and Ruth Husband

Awards
- National Champion Western Pleasure, National Champion Halter stallion

Honors
- Legion of Masters (++++) award
- Last updated on: January 12, 2008.

Khemosabi (1967–2001) was a bay Arabian stallion with four stockings and a blaze, who had significant accomplishments in the horse show ring, winning multiple National Championships in both halter and western pleasure performance competition. These wins earned him the highest level achievement award offered by the Arabian Horse Association: the Legion of Masters. In the course of his breeding career, he sired over 1200 foals. Of these, over 300 were show champions and 75 won national championships.

== Background ==
Khemosabi was bred by Dr. Bert and Ruth Husband, sired by the stallion Amerigo and out of the mare Jurneeka++. This pedigree was primarily a combination of bloodlines from the breeding programs of W.K. Kellogg and Henry Babson. Khemosabi's dam (female) line traced to *Wadduda, the celebrated "War Mare" imported from the desert by American political cartoonist, Homer Davenport. The closest imported horse in his pedigree was his maternal granddam, the Polish-bred mare *Szarza, As such, Khemosabi was a product of Arabian bloodlines that had been developed in the United States for several generations, and therefore was promoted as an "All-American" horse.

Khemosabi was foaled in Husband's back yard in Whittier, California. As a young horse, his career was popularized by a series of lighthearted cartoons written by Paul Husband, son of Bert and Ruth Husband, illustrated by Karen Haus Grandpre, which featured Khemosabi as a horse who wore a "Lone Ranger" mask, accompanied on his adventures by his "faithful redhaired companion, Ruth," a character modeled on Mrs. Husband. In the cartoon strip, Khemo and Ruth fought for "truth, justice and the Arabian Way". Khemosabi was noted for having a large and enthusiastic fan base, and a Breyer Horse model was created with his likeness in the 1990s.

In his show career, Khemosabi was the 1973 U. S. National Champion Halter Stallion, and the 1976 U. S. National Champion and Canadian National Champion in Western Pleasure. He was also the 1976 Canadian National Champion Halter Stallion. He was one of the only horses to ever win an Arabian National Championship in both halter and performance in the same year, and one of only four stallions to win U.S. National Championships in both halter and performance.

Khemosabi stood at stud in 1969, his first breeding season, on lease to Varian Arabians. After his national wins, he was syndicated in 1980 by the Husband's son, Paul, with Ruth Husband serving as Syndicate Manager from the inception of the Khemosabi Syndicate for the rest of the stallion's life. Khemosabi died in 2001 at the age of 34.

== Pedigree ==
Skowronek (GSB) (General Stud Book); 1909 gray
*Raseyn; 1923 gray imported
Rayya (GSB); 1915 bay
Ferseyn; 1937 gray
Rustem (GSB); 1908 bay
*Ferda; 1913 bay imported
Feluka (GSB); 1899 chestnut
Amerigo; 1962 gray
Kuhailan Said (PASB); 1934 bay
Ali Said (PASB) (Polish Arabian Stud Book); 1940 gray
Najada (PASB); 1932 gray
*Szarza; 1956 gray
Kuhailan Abu Urkub (PASB); 1935 bay
Salwa (PASB) (Polish Arabian Stud Book); 1945 gray
Sabda (PASB); 1940 gray
Khemosabi++++// 1967 bay stallion
*Fadl; 1930 gray imported
Fadheilan; 1942 bay
*Kasztelanka; 1929 bay imported
Fadjur; 1952 bay
Farawi; 1936 bay
Bint Sahara; 1942 gray
Bint Sedjur; 1935 gray
Jurneeka++ 1958 bay
*Fadl; 1930 gray imported
Fadheilan; 1942 bay
*Kasztelanka; 1929 bay imported
Fadneeka; 1950 bay
Rabel; 1939 chestnut
Raneeka; 1944 bay
Monica; 1926 bay
