= Henry Babson =

19th and 20th-century American businessman and horse breeder

- Born: December 1, 1875; Massachusetts, United States
- Died: October 1970 (aged 94); Illinois, United States
- Occupation(s): Entrepreneur, Businessman
- Known for: Investor, Arabian horse breeder

Henry B. Babson (December 1, 1875 – October, 1970) was an American entrepreneur, investor in phonograph technology, and notable breeder of Arabian horses. He moved to Chicago at the age of 17 at the urging of inventor Leon Douglass. While working at the 1893 World's Columbian Exposition, better known as the Chicago World Fair, Babson first encountered purebred Arabian horses brought from the Middle East for exhibition, and decided that some day he would own such horses for himself.

Though Babson himself was not an inventor, he became wealthy by selling innovative products, particularly the Victor Phonograph, and was acquainted with inventors such as Thomas Edison. He made many successful business decisions based on new designs or technologies, choosing, for example, to sell a new design of milking machine, or investing in new phonograph companies. However, his interest in the new, innovative, and beautiful was particularly reflected in his personal life. He hired Louis Sullivan to design his country estate, enjoyed racing custom sailboats, and, in the 1930s, began to import Arabian horses to the United States.

== Early life and professional career ==
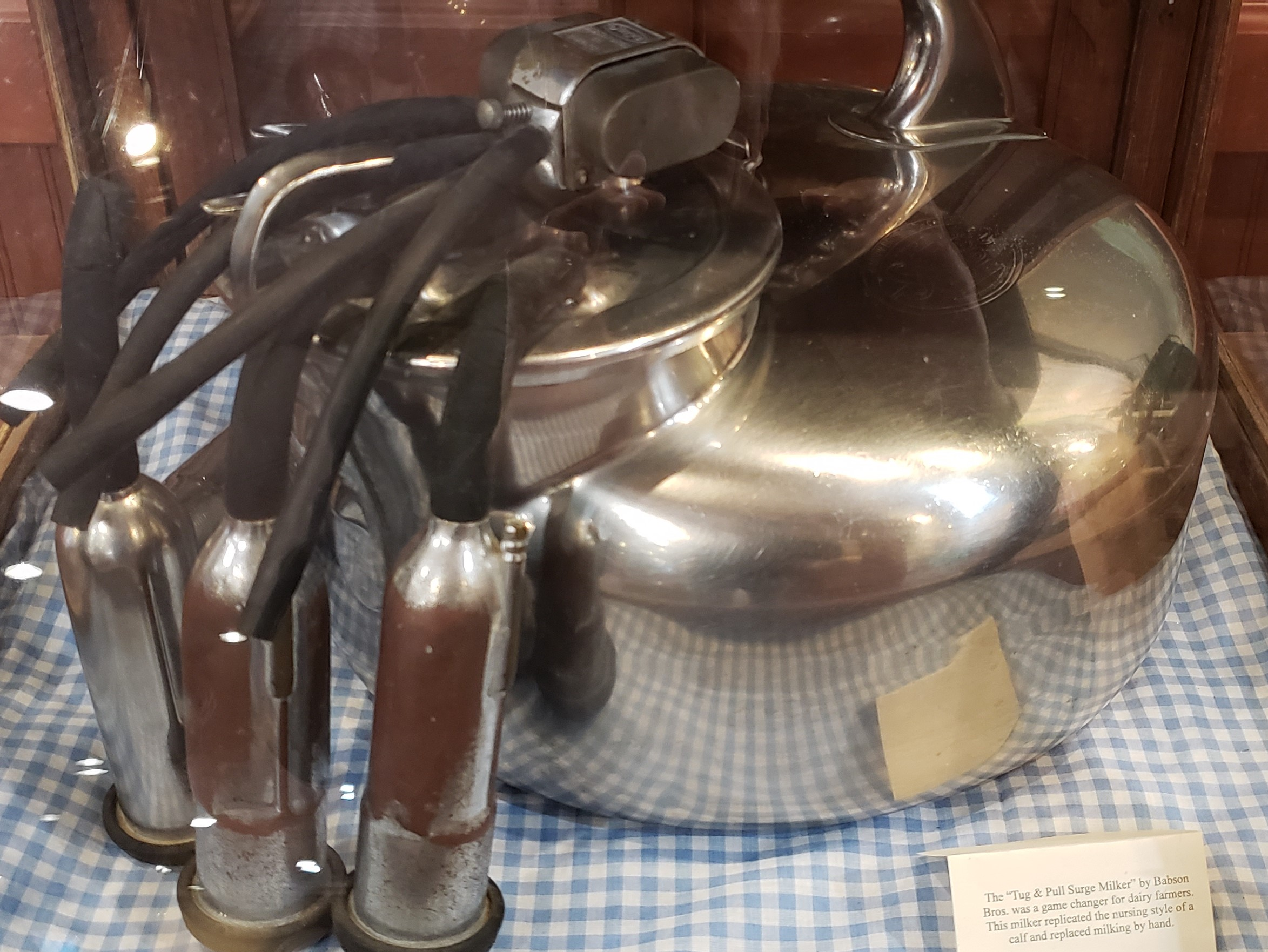
Babson Brothers "Tug & Pull Surge Milker"

Babson was the son of Augustus "Gus" Babson and Laura Margaret (Davis). He was born in Massachusetts in 1875 and grew up in Seward County, Nebraska.

He made the acquaintance of fellow Nebraskan Leon Douglass, who at the time worked for the Nebraska Phonograph Company. Douglass was an inventor and patented a number of improvements to the phonograph and was a pioneer in the development of color technology for film. After moving to Chicago, Babson first worked at the World's Fair for $1 a day, possibly in Douglass' slot phonograph concession (Douglass had invented a coin-slot attachment for the phonograph, creating the immediate predecessor to the jukebox). He then obtained work from Douglass, who by then had become a manager of the Chicago Central Phonograph Company, which was part of the Thomas Edison-affiliated North American Phonograph Company, distributor for the Edison Phonograph. Babson's starting salary was $15 a week and he was a cashier. For a brief time, at Douglass' direction, he also worked in San Francisco, running a slot phonograph concession and a parlor, which he then sold in 1895, at Douglass' direction, to Peter Bacigalupi, a pioneer of early music recordings, and the business became known as "Edison's Kinetoscope, Phonograph and Graphophone Arcade."

Babson returned to Chicago and continued to rise in the sound recording sales industry. Beginning in 1903, he traveled worldwide, including China, Russia, the Far East and Europe as a representative for the Victor Talking Machine Company, selling over $100,000 worth of phonographs. Later, with his brothers, Fred and Gus, he started the Babson Brothers Company in Chicago, a mercantile and catalog mail order company similar to Sears, Roebuck and Company, which was a major seller of the Edison Phonograph, as well as Babson Records, Burlington watches, clothing, shoes, and farm supplies. He also became a director of the Talking Machine Company of Chicago and then a major stockholder in the Victor Talking Machine Company, of which his mentor Leon Douglass was the first Vice-President. Victor was the manufacturer of the highly successful Victrola phonograph. The company was eventually acquired by RCA. Due to his success in business and investments, Babson was able to travel internationally and ultimately fulfilled his dream of owning purebred Arabian horses. In 1907 he commissioned architect Louis Sullivan to design a 28-acre estate in Riverside, Illinois.

== Babson Farm ==
*Fadl, Arabian stallion imported from Egypt in 1932 and leading sire at the Babson Farm. Rider is G. Cason

Babson obtained Arabian horses from England, Poland, and most notably, Egypt. He began to travel in search of the finest quality Arabian horses in 1930, traveling to England, France, and Spain, but was unable to purchase horses of the quality he sought. In 1932, when he was 57 years old, he made his first major importation from Egypt of two stallions and five mares, and built a farm near Grand Detour, Illinois, for his horse breeding operation. In 1938 and 1939, he imported four Arabians from Poland to cross on his Egyptian-bred stock. In 1940 and 1941, and again in 1958 he imported a small number of English-bred Arabians via farms in Canada and England. Over the years, Babson-bred horses excelled in the horse show ring in both halter (horse conformation) classes and various performance disciplines under saddle and in harness. Respected for his contributions to the Arabian horse breed in the United States, Babson served as President of the Arabian Horse Registry, now part of the Arabian Horse Association from 1949 until 1957.

The most notable of Babson's imports was the stallion *Fadl, who went on to sire the champion Fa-Serr, who is a major genetic source of the color black in modern Arabians. Fadl's most famous son, however, was the half-Egyptian, half-Polish stallion Fadheilan, sire of the legendary champion of the 1960s, Fadjur, grandsire of Khemosabi, a national champion in both halter and performance, who was one of the most significant Arabian sires of the 1970s and 1980s. Today, *Fadl is found in at all "straight Babson" (or "Babson Egyptian") pedigrees. The best-known horses of his Polish imports were the stallion *Sulejman, who sired many champions, and the mare *Azja IV, who became the dam of the major American-bred sire Azraff.

By the early 1960s, Babson decided to concentrate his breeding program solely on the subgroup of Arabian bloodstock now known as "Babson Egyptian" bloodlines. He kept his breeding stock that was descended from his original Egyptian imports and sold his non-Egyptian bred horses. He then began to cross some of his stock on the "new" Egyptian imports that began to arrive in the United States in the 1950s and 1960s, primarily the descendants of the stallion Nazeer. After almost 40 years of horse breeding, Babson died in 1970, and his breeding operation continued until 1999.

== Babson breeding today ==
Babson's most enduring legacy was his contribution to the Arabian horse breed. Babson bloodlines are noted for producing Arabian horses of substance with calm, steady, trainable dispositions, used for dressage and endurance riding as well as many different horse show disciplines in both the United States and Europe. Horses strongly influenced by Babson breeding are generally darker in color, mostly dark bay, liver chestnut and black.

Approximately 230 Arabian horses today are pure, direct descendants of the Babson Egyptian imports and are referred to as "straight Babson" or "Babson Egyptian" horses. However, Arabians with "Babson-influenced" bloodlines number in the thousands, both in what are known as "Domestic" pedigrees (Arabians with ancestors imported to the United States prior to 1944) and "Straight Egyptian" pedigrees (Arabians with ancestors all tracing to Egyptian bloodstock). Both the "straight Babson" group and the "Babson-influenced" group of bloodlines have preservation breeders working to preserve the Babson influence.
