= Fadjur =

Arabian stallion

- Breed: Arabian
- Sire: Fadheilan
- Grandsire: *Fadl
- Dam: Bint Sahara
- Maternal grandsire: Farawi
- Sex: Stallion
- Foaled: 1952
- Country: United States
- Breeder: Harry Linden
- Owner: Marge Tone
- Last updated on: March 13, 2008.

Fadjur, Foaled April 12, 1952, died 1983, was an Arabian horse who was bred in Spokane, Washington and resided in Stockton, California. A bay stallion, he was nicknamed "The Fabulous Fadjur" and sired numerous progeny from the Jack Tone Ranch over a thirty-year period.

He was a prolific breeder of champion horses, and is the maternal grandsire of Khemosabi.

== Pedigree ==
Ibn Rabdan (RAS)
*Fadl
Mahroussa (Egypt)
Fadheilan
Koheilan (PASB)
*Kasztelanka
Bialogrodka (PASB)
Fadjur
Farana
Farawi
Ghazawi
Bint Sahara
Ribal
Bint Sedjur
Sedjur
