= World Arabian Horse Organization =

The World Arabian Horse Organization (WAHO) is the world organization for the preservation and improvement of Arabian horses. WAHO grants membership to nations after examination of national breeding stud books, and review of regulations for each country. WAHO was founded in 1970.

== WAHC ==
World Arabian Horse Championship (WAHC) in beautiful horse competitions was held for 40 years in Paris. In 2023 was held in Qatar.

== Members ==
WAHO Member Nations
Egypt	Egyptian Agricultural Organization
Algeria	Office National De Developpement Des Elevages Equinss (O.N.D.E.E.)
Argentina	Stud Book Argentino
Azerbaijan	Azerbaijan Arabian Horses Club
Australia	The Arabian Horse Society of Australia, Ltd.
Bahrain	Royal Arabian Stud of Bahrain
Belgium	Belgisch Arabisch Paardenstamboek
Belize	Belize Arabian Stud Book
Brazil; Paraguay; Bolivia	Associacao Brasileira Dos Criadores Do Cavalo Arabe
Bulgaria	Executive Agency for Selection & Reproduction in Animal Breeding
Chile; Peru	Sociedad de Fomento Agricola de Temuco
Denmark	Dansk Selskab for Arabisk Hesteavl
Germany; Luxembourg	Association of Breeders and Friends of the Arabian Horse (Verband der Züchter und Freunde des Arabischen Pferdes) (VZAP)
Finland	Finnish Arab Horse Society
France	Stud Book Francais du Cheval Arabe
United Kingdom; Ireland; Malta; Greece	The Arab Horse Society
Iraq	Registrar, Iraqi Arabian Horse Organization
Iran	Equestrian Federation of Islamic Republic of Iran
Israel	Israel Arab Horse Registry
Italy	Associazione Nazionale Italiana Cavallo Arabo (ANICA)
Jordan	Registrar Royal Jordanian Stud Book Authority
Canada	Canadian Arabian Horse Registry
Kazakhstan	Arabian Horse Society of Kazakhstan
Qatar	Qatar Arabian Horse Registry
Colombia	Asociación Colombiana de Criadores de Caballos Arabes
Kuwait	Kuwait Arabian Horse Registry, Hunting & Equestrian Club
Lebanon	S.P.A.R.C.A.
Libya	Libyan Arabian Horse Breeders Society
Lithuania	Lithuanian Horse Breeders Association
Morocco	Ministere de l'Agriculture; Direction De L'Elevage
Namibia	Arab Horse Breeders Society of Namibia
New Zealand	New Zealand Arab Horse Breeders Society Inc.
Netherlands	Arabische VolboedpaardenStamboek in Nederland
Norway	Norwegian Arab Horse Society
Austria	Verband der Vollblutaraber-Züchter Österreich
Oman	The Royal Cavalry
Pakistan	Pakistan Arabian Horse Society
Poland	Polish Arabian Stud Book (PASB)
Portugal	Associacao Portuguesa de Criadores de Racas Selectas
Romania	Romsilva Dept. of Horse Breeding, Exploitation & Improvement (DHBEA) Bd.
Russia	Russian Arabian Stud Book, All-Russia Research Institute of Horse Breeding
Saudi Arabia	King Abdul Aziz Arabian Horse Center
Sweden	Swedish Arab Horse Registry (SAHR)
Switzerland	Schweizer Zuchtgenossenschaft fuer Arabische Pferde (SZAP)
Zimbabwe	Arab Horse Society of Zimbabwe
Slovakia	Narodny Zrebcin Topolcianky
Slovenia	Slovenian Arabian Stud Book Authority
Spain	Asociación Española de Criadores de Caballos Árabes (A.E.C.C.A)
South Africa	The Arab Horse Society of South Africa
Syria	Arabian Horse Office, Ministry of Agriculture & Agrarian Reform (MAAR)
Czech Republic	Purebred Arabian Horse Association – ACHPAK
Tunisia	Association Fondation Nationale D'Amelioration
Turkey	Turkish Arabian Horse Registry
Hungary	Society of Hungarian Arabian Horse Breeders
Uruguay	Sociedad Criadores de Caballos Arabes
Venezuela	ASOARABE
United Arab Emirates	Emirates Arabian Horse Society
United States; Mexico; Panama	Arabian Horse Association; Purebred Arabian Horse Trust

== Candidates for membership ==
Candidates for WAHO membership
Ecuador	Associacion de Criadores de Caballos Arabes del Ecuador (ACCAE)
Estonia	Arab Horse Stud Book
Japan	Japan Race Horse Registry
Croatia	Croatian Livestock Centre; Department for Horse Breeding
Cuba	Comandante de la Revolucion
Panama	Panama Arabian Stud Book Authority bisher bei den USA
