= Yeguada Militar de Jerez de la Frontera =

Andalusian and Arabian horse farm in Spain

Coordinates: 36°41′47.79856″N 6°7′18.92935″W

Coat of arms of Yeguada Militar

The Yeguada Militar de Jerez de la Frontera (en: Military Stud of Jerez de la Frontera), known outside Spain as the Yeguada Militar, is a military Spanish stud farm headquartered in Andalusia, Spain, dedicated to horse breeding of purebred Andalusian horses and Arabian horses. Founded in 1847, it became the state military stud farm in 1893. In the 20th century, as need for cavalry horses declined, the stud's emphasis shifted to become a genetic reservoir to preserve the bloodlines of the Pure Spanish Horse and to continue to breed high quality Arabian horses, with stallions of both breeds being made available to private horse breeders to improve the horses of Spain. Today, there are two facilities located in the Jerez de la Frontera area, one primarily for stallions, the other for mares and foals, as well as multiple stallion depots across the country.

== Location ==
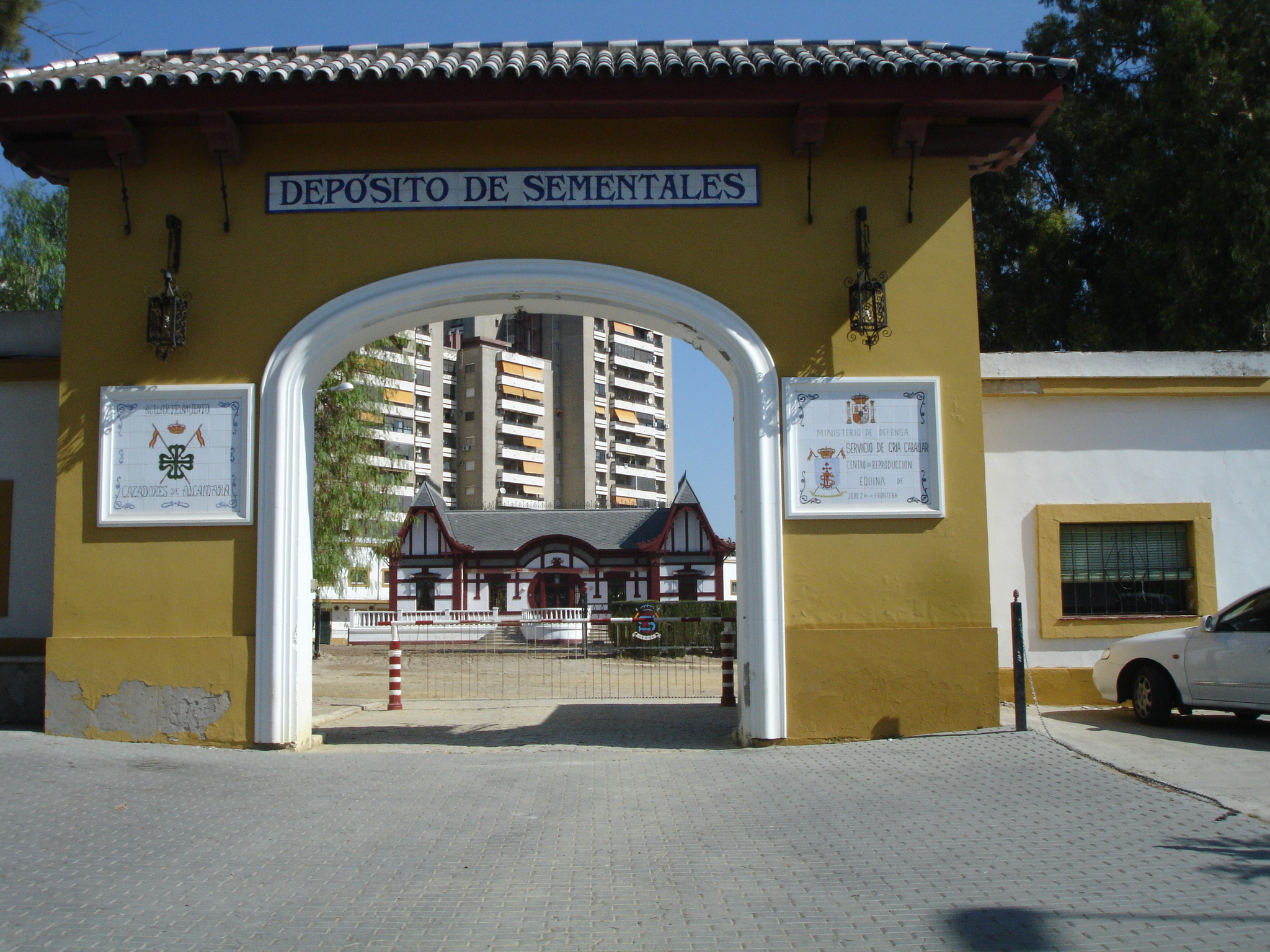
Entrance to the Senentales facility

The modern stud has two locations close to one another, Vicos (Cortijo de Vicos), located between Jerez de la Frontera and Arcos de la Frontera, and the Garrapilo (Depósito de Sementales) in the north area of Jerez de la Frontera. There are also seven stallion depots scattered throughout Spain. Vicos has 1042 hectares of land and Garrapilos has 630 hectares. Mares live at Vicos, with unbred fillies kept separate from the mares with unweaned foals, and weanling colts go to Garrapilo until the age of five, at which point some mature stallions remain at Jerez de la Frontera, and others are placed at various centers across Spain. Annual competitions are held during the Feria de Jerez. The Guadalete River provides water to both properties.

== History ==
The stud was founded in 1847, and at that time hosted what today is the oldest written breed registry for purebred Arabian horses in the world. During the mid-19th century, the need for Arabian blood to improve the breeding stock for light cavalry horses in Europe resulted excursions to the Middle East sponsored by Queen Isabella II, who sent representatives to the desert to purchase Arabian horses. Her successor, King Alfonso XII imported additional Arabian bloodstock from other European nations.

By 1893, the state military stud farm, Yeguada Militar was established by Royal Order from the Spanish Minister of War in Moratalla, in Córdoba, Spain, with the primary goal of crossbreeding Arabians on Iberian horses to improve Spanish stock for the cavalry. The original mandate was for 75 broodmares of various breeds to be purchased, kept at Moratalla, and fed grain and hay raised on land owned or leased by the Spanish military. All costs were to be paid by the Spanish Military Horse Services and the cavalry would provide staff. Stallions allowed to service mares would be those "deemed to have the most appropriate blood; analyzing thoroughly and scientifically all measures deemed to contribute to the purpose of improving the equine population." Assessment of stallions was to be made public and any young horses that did not meet the standards of the Yeguada Militar were to be sold and funds used to supplement the operation of the program.

During the Spanish Civil War, the Vicos location was used by the forces of Francisco Franco as a concentration camp for both military and civilian prisoners from the Jerez area.

== Arabian breeding ==
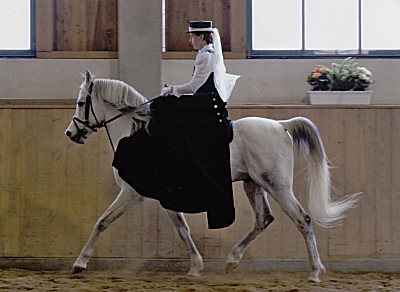
Purebred Arabian sired by a Yeguada Militar-bred stallion

The military remained heavily involved in the importation and breeding of Arabians in Spain well into the early 20th century. Between 1905 and 1908, the Yeguada Militar purchased 23 more Arabians from the Middle East, and in 1906 began to purchase additional Arabians from breeders in Poland.

Many private breeders contributed stock. Significant among the private Arabian breeders in Spain whose efforts contributed to the bloodstock of the Yeguada Militar was Cristobal Colon de Aguilera, XV Duque de Veragua, a direct descendant of Christopher Columbus, who founded the Veragua Stud in the 1920s. He imported a number of Arabians from the Crabbet Arabian Stud in England, but he was killed and his horses were scattered during the Spanish Civil War. A number of his mares were later recovered, identifiable to ownership and purebred breeding through their brands, though their individual identities were unknown. They were given new names, all with the prefix "Vera" (for Veragua) and incorporated into the broodmare herd at Moratella. However, a closed gene pool and limited focus on Arabians had dropped the number of purebred Arabians in Spain to a low of 328 by the 1960s.

== Andalusian (PRE) breeding ==
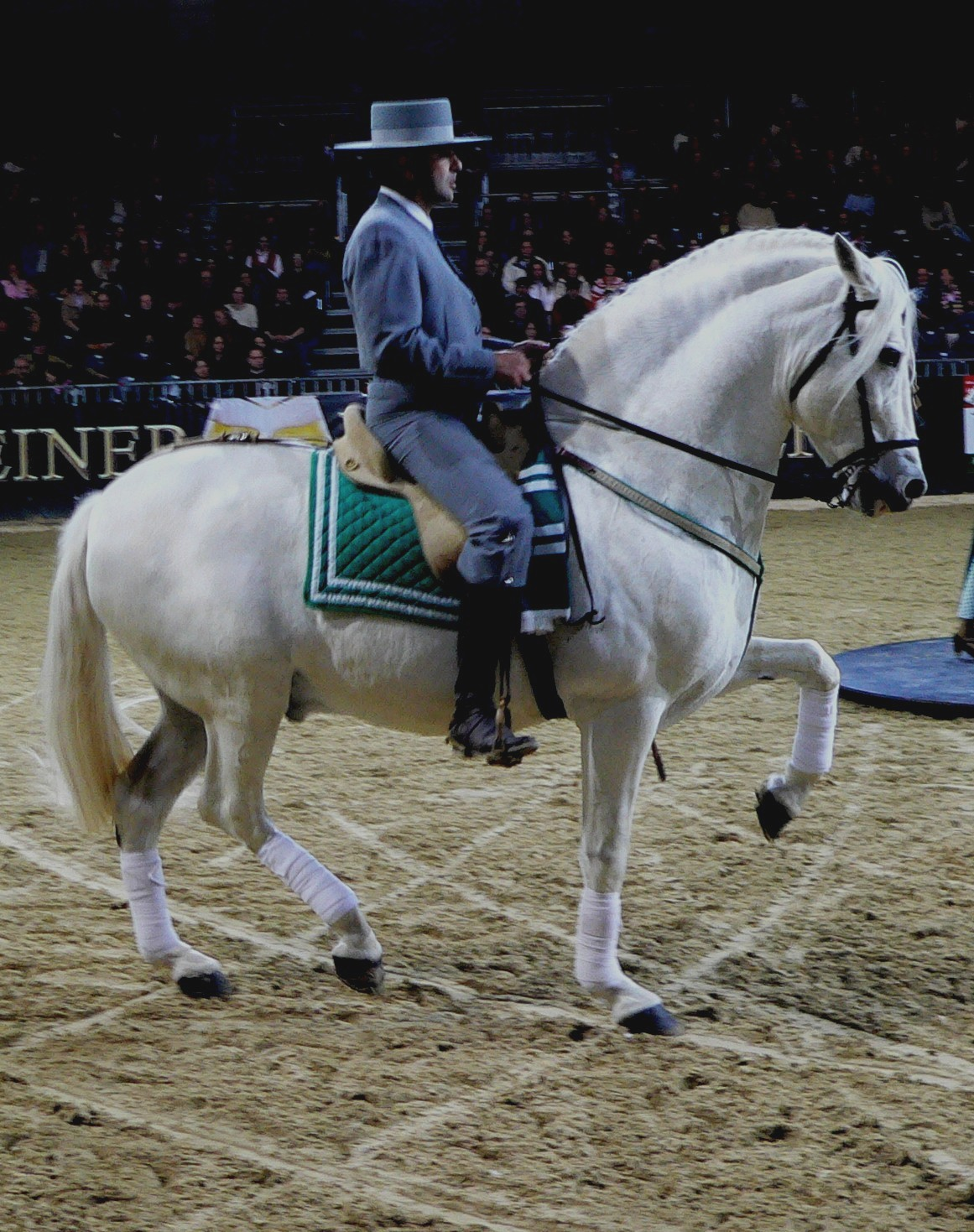
Andalusian horse exhibited at Equitana

The 1893 facility owned 18 purebred Andalusian mares. The breeders of Pure Spanish Horses (Pura Raza Española or PRE) who contributed these foundation mares included Don Francisco Molina, Don Francisco Rioboo, Don Gregario Garcia, Don Pedro Guerrero, Don Rafael Romero, Mrs. Widow of don Vicente de los Rios. By 1949 there were 84 PRE mares at the facility.

== Modern day ==
Today, although horses are no longer bred for military uses, there are still civilian uses for horses. As the primary goal of the Yeguada Militar remains to produce stallions to improve the bloodstock of horses through Spain, the Yeguada Militar keeps about 35 Arabian broodmares and between 100 and 120 Andalusian (PRE) mares. They also own about 100 stallions kept at the stallion depots to cover mares owned by private breeders for a very low stud fee. Other stallions remain at Jerez de la Frontera. If a stallion is not going to be used to sire a registered horse, the owner of the mare pays no stud fee. Private breeders may also ask the government to be allowed to stand a Yeguara Militar stallion at their own farm for a limited period.

The stallions are selected for service after putting the colts through vigorous testing so that only the best stallions are selected. The stud has an agreement with the Royal Andalusian School of Equestrian Art to train the stallions and provide horses for exhibition and dressage competition. They keep the best fillies for broodmares, selling the rest to private owners. Following an assessment of the breeding stock, there is an annual auction of surplus mares and fillies.

Outside Arabian bloodlines have been brought into Spain since the 19th century, but a distinct look and type of Arabian horse has been preserved. In part due to the support and work of the Yeguada Militar there are now approximately 13,000 registered purebred Arabian horses in Spain. The stud also serves as a genetic reservoir for the Andalusian horse or Pura Raza Espanola. The Yeguada Militar still has the goal to "breed, select, and improve the Pure Spanish PRE breeds."

In addition to horse breeding, the Yeguada Militar also works on environmental initiatives, working with the Ministry of Environment to protect the imperial eagle, which lives on land owned by the stud.

In 2000, the Las Mejores Ganaderias deo Mundo stated:

The breeding plan (of Yeguada Militar) is intimately bound to the improvement project, based on getting a horse that, without losing the qualities that it possesses and following the breeds' pattern, improves its qualities and eliminates defects. The means of this plan of improvement are based on a continuous evaluation and selection process for individual type, improving the environment and the genetic selection.
