= Arabian Horse Association =

American horse breed registry for Arabian and part-Arabian horses

The Arabian Horse Association (AHA) is a national organization that registers Arabian horses in the United States. It also works with the United States Equestrian Federation to sanction horse shows and license judges for Arabian horses.

The AHA was formed by a merger between the International Arabian Horse Association (IAHA) and the Arabian Horse Registry of America (AHRA) in 2003. AHRA was the older of the two organizations, a breed registry founded in 1908. IAHA, founded in 1950, organized to "meet the breeding, competitive and recreational interests of all Arabian horse owners", and also maintained a Half-Arabian and Anglo-Arabian registry.

== Arabian horse shows ==
AHA shows are for purebred Arabian, Half-Arabian, and Anglo-Arabian horses only. The shows consist of Arabian Community Shows that allow exhibitors to get a start in the show ring, followed by "Class A" shows rated by the United States Equestrian Federation and the AHA, which qualify riders to go to larger regional and national competition.

There are four separate national competitions: U.S. Nationals, Sport Horse Nationals, Youth Nationals, and Canadian Nationals. There are also some significant non-national shows that draw large numbers of horses, including the "Buckeye" show in Ohio and the Scottsdale Arabian Horse Show, the annual show of the Arizona Arabian Horse Association.

The U.S. Nationals, held each October, were held for many years every other year at Louisville, Kentucky and Albuquerque, New Mexico. However, beginning 2008, the U.S. Nationals moved permanently to Tulsa, Oklahoma. The Youth Nationals is held in Albuquerque, New Mexico at the end of July. Youth Nationals currently draws about 2100 horses. The youth also have their own Association, the Arabian Horse Youth Association (AHYA), who bring the youths' voices to the AHA. In addition to regular classes, Youth Nationals also hosts several "fun classes" such as the dog races, dog costume contest, and most famously, the golf cart parade.

The Canadian Nationals are no longer held in August as the Board of Directors have permanently suspended this show. Through 2010, they were held in Regina, Saskatchewan, and in 2011 moved to Brandon, Manitoba. This competition is also known as the "Royal Red" and features classes for both adults and youths.

The Sport Horse Nationals are held in alternating locations in the eastern and western United States, including North Carolina in 2017, Idaho in 2018, and Illinois in 2019. This primarily English riding competition focuses on the hunt seat and Olympic-style disciplines of dressage, show hunter, show jumping, and competitive driving. There are also Equitation classes, in-hand breeding classes and "flat" or pleasure classes. It is currently the fastest-growing of the national level shows for Arabian horses.

At the National level, placings are decided by panels of three judges who each write their own placings separately, with final numbers calculated by computer, combining the results of all three judges' "cards".

== Distance riding ==
The AHA has promoted endurance riding and sponsors a National Distance Championship. They also offer two Trail Ride Vacations each year, one at Fort Robinson State Park, in Crawford, Nebraska, and another at the V6 Ranch in Parkfield, California.

== Registry ==
Both the purebred and half-Arabian/Anglo-Arabian registries are housed within AHA. For a time, the AHRA had been embroiled in a controversy that had resulted in the creation an independent registry for the purpose of exporting American-bred Arabians to other countries. However, AHA resolved the dispute and in 2007, AHA was admitted to the World Arabian Horse Association (WAHO), making it the official recognized registry for the purpose of worldwide import and export of Arabian horses.

The Purebred Arabian stud book is actually owned by the Purebred Arabian Trust (PAT), which grants AHA an exclusive license to manage the registry. Policies and procedures for registration of animals are set by the Registration Commission, a joint committee made up of representatives of both PAT and AHA. The membership of AHA has no authority over the purebred registry other than via its ability to elect representatives to the commission. The Half-Arabian/Anglo-Arabian registry is owned by the AHA.

== Foundation ==
The Arabian Horse Association created a 501(c)(3) foundation in 2007 that supports youth scholarships, education, and research efforts to uncover the roots of diseases affecting Arabian horses.

== History of IAHA ==
The International Arabian Horse Association (IAHA), though a newer group, was the better-known of the two organizations that merged to create the AHA, because of its role in sanctioning horse shows, developing rules, and licensing judges. IAHA had worked with the American Horse Shows Association (then AHSA, now USEF) to create approved All-Arabian horse shows and propose rules for the Arabian division of AHSA . It was founded in 1950 By 1957 and 1958, it had organized the first U.S. and Canadian national championships. Its membership peaked at over 32,000 members in the 1980s. It entered into a merger agreement with the AHRA in 2002, and in 2003, the AHA officially came into being. The final years of IAHA prior to the AHA merger were embroiled in controversy.

=== Controversy of Michael Brown ===
After considerable discussion over the years over how to improve the quality of judges and judging, IAHA appointed Michael Brown as its first Judges and Stewards Commissioner. He served from 1989 until 2001. Brown attempted to crack down on members of the association for rule violations, and was particularly noted for the prosecution of one prominent trainer, who was also a licensed judge, for having "plastic surgery" and other artificial enhancements performed on the horses in his care, including tattooing and liposuction. Some members accused Brown of practicing favoritism by prosecuting some members and not others. But while the individual in question was suspended for five years and several horses he had shown disqualified for assorted championships, this person filed suit against the organization, along with several other individuals who owned horses associated with him. Some of these large lawsuits were against the association and others named Brown personally. IAHA successfully defended the lawsuit brought by the trainer, though accumulated crippling legal fees in doing so. On the advice of counsel and their insurer, IAHA settled the remaining cases.

Brown volunteered to resign after controversy about his fundraising methods for defending against the lawsuits and his creation of a personal legal defense fund. After leaving IAHA, Brown became the director of the Federal Emergency Management Agency (FEMA), during the presidency of George W. Bush, and was once again a target of controversy in the wake of Hurricane Katrina.

== See also ==
- Arabian horse
- United States Equestrian Federation

== References and footnotes ==
- interview with IAHA Secretary Gary Dearth about Brown
- Karl Hart article at awhitehorse.com (cached)
