= Carl Raswan =

German writer & equine expert (1893-1966)

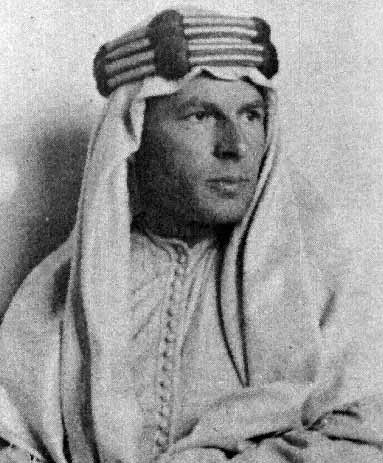
Carl Raswan in Bedouin regalia, 1927

Carl Reinhard Raswan (7 March 1893 – 14 October 1966), born Carl Reinhard Schmidt, was one of the greatest connoisseurs and patrons of the asil Arabian horse. He authored numerous books on Arabian horses and the Bedouin people who raised them. A scholar of Arabian bloodlines, he also published the Raswan Index, an extensive compilation of Arabian horse pedigree and strain information. He advocated tolerance and understanding of Bedouin ways of life and culture in Arabia.

== Early years ==
Carl Raswan was born Carl Reinhard Schmidt in Dresden, Laubegast-Tolkewitz, in 1893, the son of Martin Schmidt and a Hungarian mother. At the age of five, Carl Raswan received a pony named "Philie" as a gift from his father. When his father purchased property in 1898, Carl took long excursions on his pony in the Dresden area, without the need to cross the Elbe river. Carl spent his school holidays with riding, often in the company of his uncle Bernhard Schmidt, a forester. During one of those holidays, Raswan observed the young Prince Ernst Heinrich of Saxony, who was riding a Shagya Arabian. Raswan noticed the horse appeared to recognize its own reflection in the water and played with it. This experience, suggesting a high degree of animal intelligence for a horse, awakened his interest in the Arabian horse; he later described it as a key event in his life.

In 1902, Raswan enrolled in the humanistic Royal Wettin Gymnasium in Dresden. The choice of this school was fortunate for him as he got the opportunity to study ancient Greece and Rome as well as the languages. Carl Raswan deepened his study of classical languages during his high school years, reading the works of Simon of Athens, Xenophon, Varro, Oppian and Palladius. After graduation in May 1911, his parents sent him on a three-week trip to Greece, during which he spent a few days in Constantinople (now Istanbul), the former capital of the Ottoman Empire. This trip marked the beginning of his journey to fulfill his childhood dream to "search for the perfect horse." He spent most of his time studying ancient works of art representing horses, such as the Parthenon frieze of the Greek sculptor Phidias, and the then-still-existing procession that contained images of hundreds of horses. Through the inspection of the private library of a friendly Greek archaeologist, Raswan learned extensively about the ancient history of the horse.

This period of reading also introduced Raswan to the two volumes of Lady Anne Blunt's A Pilgrimage to Nejd, which impressed him deeply and inspired his later statement: "After my return from Athens I could no longer imagine my future in Europe... ".

== First trip to the Middle East ==
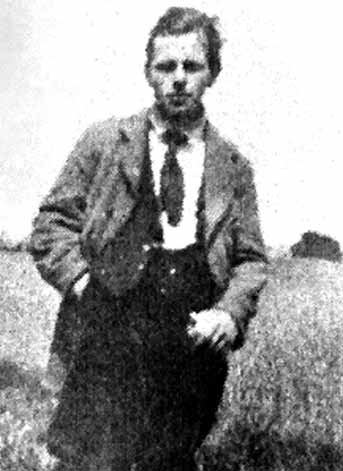
Raswan at age 19 as an agricultural intern near Alexandria, Egypt, 1912

Inspired by the writings of Lady Anne and his studies of ancient artwork, Raswan returned from Greece and soon began to study everything related to Arabia, and in a few years he mastered both the language as well as the writing to a native level. Raswan first traveled to the Middle East in 1911 on an invitation to Egypt from his cousin, who handled an Import/Export operation in Cairo. He traveled via Trieste and Alexandria to Cairo and saw for the first time the beauty and diversity of the Middle East. By 1912, Raswan had moved up to a job as an assistant at the Santa Stefano farm near Ramle, east of Alexandria, where he was responsible for irrigation techniques and farm issues, working extensively with the problems facing the rural population. His then 16-year-old sister, Charlotte Schmidt, followed Raswan to Egypt to help him to take over the financial management at Ramle.

On their excursions on horseback in the area around Alexandria, Raswan and his sister first made the acquaintance with the Bedouins in the area. One day they met Sheikh Ammer Ibn-el-Aide of the Would Ali tribe, who rode a small Arabian stallion named Ghazal (Arabic for gazelle). In the tent of Sheikh Raswan first learned about the customs and family life of the Bedouin, and where he also became acquainted with Marzuki, the former equerry to the Egyptian king Tewfik (also Taufik).

In his ongoing search for the "dream horse", Raswan was invited by Marzuki to join him as an assistant on a trip to Jerusalem and Damascus. On this journey, he had his first opportunity to be in contact with the horse-breeding Bedouin tribes. Sheikh Ammer loaned Raswan his stallion Ghazal for this trip. The friendship between the Sheikh and Raswan became so close that he was nicknamed "Aziz" (Arabic for "Dear"). This nickname also helped Carl Raswan later in other contacts with the Bedouin. During this journey, which lasted about one year, Raswan learned many ways to deal with the nomadic tribes of Arab Bedouin. He learned much about their ways of life, religion, and made a study to understand the social fabric of the Bedouin tribes.

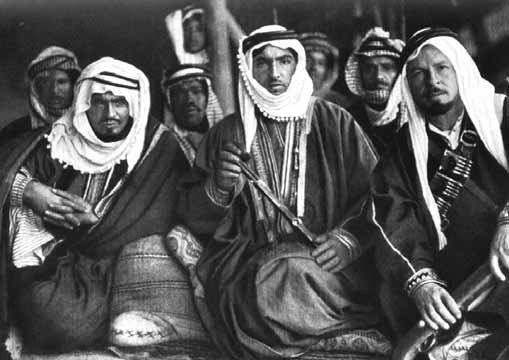
Carl Raswan (right) in the tent of the Bedouin chief Ruala along with Raswan's blood brother, Prince Fuaz, 1930

During this first journey, his interest in the Arabian horse and his experiences in the desert led to the blood brotherhood between Raswan and young Bedouin Prince Fawaz as-Shaalan (Fuaz). This close relationship continued until the death of Raswan. During this trip, as Raswan later wrote in his book "Drinkers of the Wind", he finally realized in the stallion Ghazal, a representative of the asil Arabian horse, his "dream horse." Sheikh Ammer later gave Ghazal to Raswan as a gift.

== World War I ==
With the beginning of World War I Raswan's life changed drastically. In the autumn of 1914, he received orders to report to the Saxon Royal Hussars Regiment No. 18 following Großenhain, but his enlistment was postponed. Raswan then reported in May 1915 to the German embassy in Constantinople as a volunteer. Raswan was involved in heavy fighting at Galipoli and fought with the 4th Turkish army at the Suez Canal, where he caught malaria and typhoid fever. After participating in battles in Mesopotamia (now Iraq), Raswan went to Ukraine in 1917, where he witnessed the Russian-German armistice. On his way home, Raswan experienced the October Revolution in Warsaw. He arrived in Dresden having lost a significant amount of weight.

== Emigration to the United States ==
Back in Dresden, Carl Raswan no longer felt at home. In 1921, he decided to move to Oakland, California to make his living there, and the US became his home of choice. It took another four years, until 1925, before Raswan fully recovered from the health consequences of the First World War.

Raswan's passion for the Arabian horse led to his acquaintance with W.K. Kellogg, a breeder of purebred Arabians near Pomona, California. In 1925, Raswan was asked by Kellogg to travel to obtain breeding stock from the Crabbet Arabian Stud in Sussex, UK, then owned by Lady Wentworth. On February 22, 1926 his selected Arabian horses, arrived. The best-quality horse of this group was the stallion *Raswan (foaled 1921), said to be the best son of the stallion Skowronek. Lady Wentworth gave *Raswan the stallion to Carl Raswan (then still known as Carl Schmidt) as a gift. Raswan or Radhwan in the Muslim faith is the angel of mercy at the entrance to Paradise.

The horse *Raswan stood at stud at the Kellogg ranch, but while there was killed in a tragic accident. Carl Raswan learned of the stallion's death, he cried: "Dead? No! He will live! From now on, everything I do is done in his name!" At that time he changed his name from Carl Schmidt to Carl Raswan.

The Kellogg ranch also provided horses for use in film. The Kellogg-owned stallion Jadaan was ridden by Raswan in April 1926 when he served as a stunt double for the actor Rudolph Valentino during shots requiring fast or dangerous riding in the film Son of the Sheik.

Beginning in the late 1930s, Carl Raswan maintained a small farm in the Sandia mountains in New Mexico where he bred purebred Arabians.

== Second trip to the Middle East ==
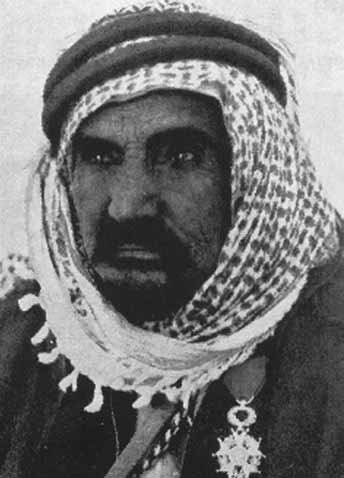
Amir Nuri al-Shaalan, long-standing leader of the Bedouin Ruala. (Photo by Carl Raswan, 1927)

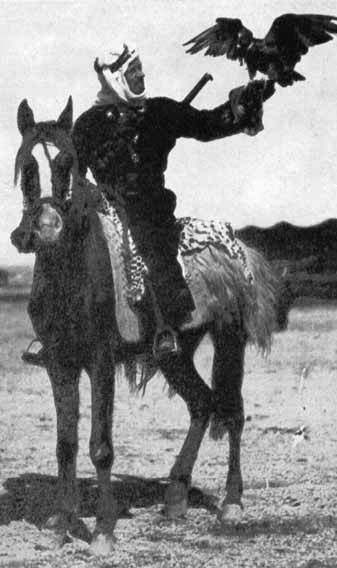
Raswan on a war mare in the Ruala camp, c. 1930

The tragic and dramatic events in America gave Carl Raswan the longing for "his" Bedouin, and so in 1926 he made a trip to the tribe of Ruala. During this trip, the close relationship between Raswan and his blood brother Prince Fawaz deepened. The prince's grandfather, Amir Nuri al-Shaalan, was also very affectionate. The experiences and lessons of this journey Raswan described in his book Black Tents of Arabia.

In 1928, Raswan undertook another trip to Central Arabia, during which he visited several Bedouin tribes. From this trip, he gained an insight that made him write a moving portrayal of the following: "The world war was the last fall of the Romantic ideals of the Bedouin life. Mauser and machine guns, and now automobiles destroy hundreds of horses in the current fighting, they advance with spears and primitive weapons ... only innocuous wounds caused chivalric virtues and with their passion and laws (e.g. the blood-revenge) held in check. - ... In October 1927, I experienced a ... case with the Fid'an-'Anaza Bedouin in which 135 mares were lost in one day ... " Carl Raswan was therefore witness a radical development, the a decline of pure Arabian horse in its region of origin, an effect breeders can still perceive. Also, the year 1928 was marked by a drought which affected the Ruala for weeks, resulting in the deaths of up to 2,000 camels.

On April 15, 1929, Carl Raswan was formally added as a member of the Ruala and into the family of Nuri al-Shaalan. This was a great honor for a European and a Christian (Raswan quote: "My religion, I had never denied to the Bedouin.") In the same year, Raswan brokered a peace agreement between 21 leaders of rival Bedouin tribes, which helped give him an excellent reputation. His experiences were described in his book The Arab and his horse, as well as in the text of the book Arabian Horse by U. Guttmann.

In 1929, Raswan also accompanied the American breeder W.R. Brown on a trip to Egypt and Syria to look for desert-bred horses. However, according to Brown’s wife, the two men apparently did not get along well, and the horses they purchased on the trip somehow never made it to America. Following that uncomfortable trip, Brown wrote the well-received The Horse of the Desert, though he never mentioned Raswan in its pages.

== Later journeys ==
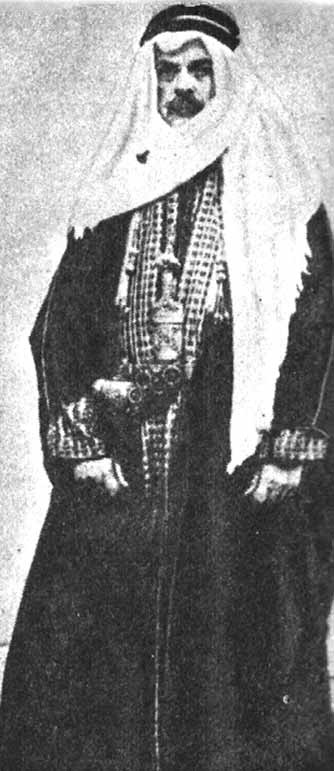
Bogdan Zietarski, stud manager of the Gumniska stud of the Polish prince Roman Sanguszko, companion to Raswan on his 1930-31 journey

In the journal ST.GEORGES, Raswan noticed a photograph of the stallion Jasir in 1929, taken at the stud of Prince Mohamed Ali. This led to a request from Pauline, Princess of Wied, the owner of the Königlich Württembergisches Gestüts Weil (Royal Wurttemberg Stud Weil), to Raswan to attempt to purchase the stallion. Raswan took the job, which proved to be harder than expected. He wrote: "... After months of negotiations ... for a personal consultation with the King of Egypt ... I finally succeeded in convincing those great lovers and breeders of fine Arabian horse in Egypt that their sacrifice, to send Jasir to Germany, would prove in the course of time to be a gain for Egypt. "

The stallion then undertook a 16-day journey by ship and train from Cairo to Weil. However, Jasir appreciated freedom above all. In Venice, he escaped onto on the sun deck of the ship, then fell into a hatch, two decks deep onto thick cotton bales, jumped up, shook himself and then ran along a narrow steel corridor into a platform from which one could overlook the entire engine room, where the runaway was captured, miraculously intact. Once in Germany, Jasir was later one of the horses who, after the dissolution of the Royal Stud in Weil, was transferred to become part of the breeding stock of the Marbach state stud.

In another journey to add to the European stock of Arabian horses, Raswan traveled in 1930 with the Polish prince Roman Sanguszko and his stud manager, Bogdan Zietarski, to acquire desert-bred Arabian horses for his farm in Gumniska (southern Poland). Together they traveled about 12,000 km in the Middle East and visited more than 10,000 horses. The result of the journey, from November 1930 until mid-1931, was the import of five stallions and four mares, of which the stallion Kuhailan Zaid db (= desertbred) went to the Hungarian stud of Bábolna, and the remaining horses to Gumniska. Another stallion from this purchase was Kuhailan Haifi, sire of the stallion Ofir, who stood at the Polish State Stud at Janów Podlaski and had a far-reaching influence on the breeding of Arabian horses worldwide through his offspring, including his son Witez II and grandson Bask. Raswan and Zietarski developed a close friendship and deep respect for each other. In a letter dated August 6, 1955 at the renowned Hippo Lodge, to Dr. John Erich Flade, a fellow countryman and friend of Raswan's, Raswan praised the expertise and horsemanship of Zietarski.

In the summer of 1936, Raswan undertook another trip to the Middle East. Originally, the purpose of the trip was a visit to his Arab friends, but owing to the political situation this proved to be extremely dangerous. Raswan usually traveled by car from Cairo to Aqaba in present-day Jordan, from there by Iraq and Baghdad via Iran and Tehran before returning by way of Alexandria and Genoa on the way back. Raswan described his odyssey in his book Escape from Baghdad.

== Final years ==
During World War II, Raswan began to sort his records in order to publish them as a book. It took him more than eight years, then Sons of the Desert was published.

After this project, he wrote in a letter to Dr. Flade, on May 11, 1955, that his next project would be to publish an index of all Arabian family trees, listing Bedouin breeders and imports of the last 100 years to Europe and America. The project was originally planned in twelve volumes, which he would produce at a rate of one every three months. However, this work, now known as the Raswan Index, took far longer. In the preparation of this work, Carl Raswan was helped extensively by his wife, Esperanza Raswan, who assisted with the writing and corrections. The work was finally published in seven volumes from 1957 to 1967, the last volumes published post-mortem, edited by Esperanza Raswan. Today, the Raswan Index is still an important reference work for breeders of Arabian horses. Later editions were condensed into three bound volumes.

In 1955, Raswan drew some conclusions from his eventful life. He extolled the lifestyle of the Bedouin, the children of Ishmael, their dignity, their life in freedom, their honor code, and their principles of humanity. In another letter to Dr. Flade, on January 16, 1965, Raswan discussed the connectedness of people of all countries and their commitment to nature and all animals.

In November and December 1965, Raswan became ill and spent a week in hospital. In a letter to Dr. Flade on December 22, 1965, he wrote that his old injuries from the First World War, injuries during his stay in the desert of Arabia, and a kidney injury inflicted in 1934 by the Gestapo in the Wiener Straße in Dresden, were all examined. The doctors determined that the healing of the wounds was good, but that his kidney, spine and lungs needed treatment. His lungs had suffered in sand storms during his stays in the desert, leading to silicosis. Raswan reported in the letter that even the Arabian horses in the desert were affected by bleeding lungs if sandstorms went on longer than two days.

On October 14, 1966, Raswan died suddenly and unexpectedly in Santa Barbara, California, presumably as a result of silicosis. On January 14, 1967 condolences were received from Mútab Prince Fawaz al-Shaalan and the Ruala, stating that Carl Raswan (aka Abd al-Aziz Ibn Radhwan, the Ruala) a loyal, loving friend, was lost.

Raswan left one son, Harold, and three daughters, Mildred, Anita and Evalynn, from his first marriage. His last marriage, to Esperanza, left two daughters, Chela and Beatriz. Carl Raswan was very close to Esperanza, about which he once said: "She is much more than my better half, she is the substance angels are made of."
