= Bandola (horse) =

Arabian mare

- Bandola
- Breed: Arabian horse
- Sire: Witraz (PASB)
- Grandsire: Ofir (PASB)
- Dam: Balalajka (PASB)
- Maternal grandsire: Amurath Sahib (PASB)
- Sex: Mare
- Foaled: March 26, 1948
- Country: Poland
- Color: Gray
- Breeder: Albigowa Stud

Record
- 2/23(4-7-7)

Bandola (March 26, 1948 – March 26, 1983) was a gray Arabian mare, known for her title, "The Queen of Poland." She was sired by Witraz, out of the Polish-bred mare, Balalajka.

== Life ==
Bandola was foaled at Poland's Albigowa Stud on March 26, 1948. She was sired by Witraz, by the famed Ofir, who also sired Witez II, and out of Balalajka, by Amurath-Sahib. Balalajka has been considered one of Poland's finest broodmares. In the spring of 1951, Bandola was sent to the Warsaw racecourses. She raced 23 times in 2 years. One year later, she was sent back to Albigowa, where she first produced premature twins, but continued to be a breeding mare. Her breeder, Roman Pankiewicz, also the deputy manager of Albigowa at the time, described Bandola by saying, "As with each beauty, Bandola was a bit vain. She always enjoyed being admired, charming visitors with her looks and distinction. She did however have a very independent character, always looking for ways to do things which were forbidden to her." In 1961, Albigowa discontinued its line of Arabians and closed, sending Bandola to the Janów Podlaski Stud Farm.

Bandola was part of a "family" with considerable significance. She was a full sister to the sire of significance, Bask, and to Arfa, who was the dam of Argos, an important sire in Great Britain for Patricia Lindsay. Her 3/4 sister Bachantka (by Wielki Szlem) had been imported to the United States in 1961 by Varian Arabians, where she was a Top Ten champion and major foundation mare for the Varian program. Her grandsire, Ofir, was included in the group of horses taken during the Soviet Invasion of Poland. Ofir was of the desert-bred stallion Kuhailan-Haifi who was imported from the Jauf region of the Arabian Peninsula by Prince Roman Sanguszko of the Gumniska Stud.

Due to general weakness, Bandola passed on her 35th birthday, on March 26, 1983. She was buried in a park near Janow next to Czort and Celebes, and was honored as the first mare to be enshrined in Janow's highly revered Park of Legends.

== Offspring and legacy ==
With the last at the age of 27, Bandola produced 16 foals during her breeding career. Her most notable include Bandos, by Negatiw, who sired 3 Derby winners and 10 Polish National Champions, and *Banat, who was the National Champion Stallion of Great Britain, and sold at the 1984 Polish Prestige Sale to the US for $525,000.

== Pedigree ==
Kuhalian-Haifi (PASB) (Imp. Poland from Arabia, 1931 )
Ofir (PASB)
Dziwa (PASB)
Witraz (PASB) (Polish Arabian Stud Book)
Fetysz
Makata (PASB)
Gazella II
Bandola; 1948 grey
35 Amurath II
Amurath Sahib (PASB)
Sahiba
Balalajka (PASB)
Ibn Mahomet
Iwonka III (PASB) exported to the United States, 1945
Lysa
