= Bandos (horse) =

Arabian stallion

- *Bandos (Note: An asterisk in front of an Arabian horse's name indicates that the horse was foaled outside of the United States and imported to the U.S.)
- Breed: Arabian horse
- Sire: Negatiw
- Grandsire: Naseem
- Dam: Bandola
- Maternal grandsire: Witraz
- Sex: Stallion
- Foaled: 1964
- Country: Foaled in Poland, imported to the United States in 1982
- Color: Gray
- Breeder: Janów Podlaski Stud Farm
- Owner: David Murdoch

Record
- 2/12{3-0-3-3}

Bandos (1964 – September 1987) was a gray Arabian stallion with Crabbet ancestry. He was sired by Negatiw, a Tersk bred stud, out of Bandola, who was known by the title of "Queen of Poland". Bandos was a sire in Poland for 11 years, and in 1982, he was imported to the United States. During his time in Poland, he sired three Derby winners and ten Polish National Champions.

== Life and career ==
Bandos was foaled at Poland's Janów Podlaski Stud Farm in 1964. He was sired by Negatiw, who was by the Skowronek son, Naseem, and out of the Polish-bred mare, Bandola. His dam was a full sister to Bask, a sire of significance. Bandos himself, at a young age, was nicknamed the "King of Janow". Bandos was considered to be one of the most influential Saglawi-type stallions. Those who knew him described him as, "Very pleasant and quiet in the stall, however, when brought out, full of fire and very animated." Bandos stood as a Janow Podlaski stud for seven years, moved to Michalow Stud for another two years, then Kurosweki Stud for another year. For the 1981 breeding season he was returned to Janow.

In September 1982, Bandos was sold for $806,000 to Ventura Farms of California during the Polish Prestige Sale at Janów Podlaski Stud Farm. He was imported to the United States by truck and plane and spent the rest of his life there until his death in September 1987.

== Offspring and legacy ==
Bandos sired 129 foals during his years in Poland, many of which went on to become champions themselves. They were sold over a three-year period at the Polish Prestige Sales for an average price of $49,000. He went on to sire three Derby winners and ten Polish National Champions. One of his most notable offspring was Eukaliptus, whose dam was Eunice, the daughter of Comet.

== Pedigree ==
Naseem, Bandos's grandsire, was a Skowronek son who in 1936 was sold to Russia by Lady Wentworth of the Crabbet Arabian Stud. A few of Bandos's ancestors, including Enwer Bay and Gazella II, were requisitioned by the Russian Army during World War II. Also during World War II, Bandos's grandsire, Ofir, was among some of the horses taken during the Soviet invasion of Poland. Ofir was of the desert-bred stallion Kuhailan-Haifi who was foaled in 1923. Kuhailan-Haifi was imported from the Jauf region of the Arabian Peninsula by Prince Roman Sanguszko of the Gumniska Stud.

Pedigree of Bandos
Sire Negatiw	Naseem	Skowronek	Ibrahim
Sire Negatiw	Naseem	Skowronek	Jaskolka
Sire Negatiw	Naseem	Nasra	Daoud
Sire Negatiw	Naseem	Nasra	Nefisa
Sire Negatiw	Taraszcza	Enwer Bey	Abu Mlech
Sire Negatiw	Taraszcza	Enwer Bey	Koalicja
Sire Negatiw	Taraszcza	Gazella II	Koheilan
Sire Negatiw	Taraszcza	Gazella II	Abra
Dam Bandola	Witraz (PASB) (Note: Polish Arabian Stud Book)	Ofir (PASB)	Kuhailan-Haifi (PASB)
Dam Bandola	Witraz (PASB)	Ofir (PASB)	Dziwa (PASB)
Dam Bandola	Witraz (PASB)	Makata (PASB)	Fetysz
Dam Bandola	Witraz (PASB)	Makata (PASB)	Gazella II
Dam Bandola	Balalajka (PASB)	Amurath Sahib (PASB)	35 Amurath II
Dam Bandola	Balalajka (PASB)	Amurath Sahib (PASB)	Sahiba
Dam Bandola	Balalajka (PASB)	Iwonka III (PASB)	Ibn Mahomet
Dam Bandola	Balalajka (PASB)	Iwonka III (PASB)	Lysa
