= Nabor =

Nabor is a masculine given name and surname which can refer to:

- Nabor (died c. 303), Christian saint and martyr
- Nabor Carrillo Flores (1911–1967), Mexican nuclear physicist
- Nabor Castillo (born 1990), Mexican judoka
- Nabor Cofré (1900–1980), Chilean politician
- Nabor Ochoa López (born 1960), Mexican politician
- Nabor Ojeda Delgado (born 1947), Mexican politician
- Nabor Vargas García (born 1976), Mexican drug lord
- Jasmine Nabor (born 1998), Filipino volleyball player
- Paul Nabor (1928–2014), Belizean singer and musician
- Naborr (1950–1977), originally named Nabor, Arabian stallion

== See also ==
- Naber, a surname
- Nabors (surname)
- Nabors Industries, an oil and gas drilling and well servicing company in Bermuda and Texas
