= AUN (disambiguation) =

AUN or Aun may refer to:

- Aun, a mythical Swedish king
- Aun (surname), an Estonian-language surname
- ASEAN University Network, an Asian university association
- A-un, the Japanese transliteration of the word "om"
- Aunn Komano, a fictional character in Hidden Star in Four Seasons from the video game series Touhou Project

== Transportation ==
- Auburn Municipal Airport (California) (FAA LID code: AUN), a public airport in California
- Common Sky (ICAO code: AUN), a former Austrian aviation company

== See also ==
- Avun, a village in Azerbaijan
