= Rõuk =

Family name

Aun
Origin
- Language: Estonian
- Meaning: a type of traditional stack made for the collection and drying of hay, cereals, or straw
- Region of origin: Estonia

Other names
- Related names: Aun, Hakk, Naber

Rõuk is an Estonian surname derived from rõuk, a type of traditional stack made for the collection and drying of hay, cereals, or straw, often made with a wooden frame.

As of 1 January 2021, 99 men and 111 women have the surname Rõuk in Estonia. Rõuk ranks 828th for men and 750th for women in the distribution of surnames in Estonia. The surname Rõuk is the most common in Järva County, where 5.02 per 10,000 inhabitants of the county bear the surname. Notable people bearing the surname Rõuk include:

- Andrus Rõuk (born 1957), artist and poet
- Aarend-Mihkel Rõuk (1943–1997), geographer, geoarchaeologist, and publisher
- Mihkel Rõuk (1891–1941), politician
- Theodor Rõuk (1891–1940), lawyer, politician, and soldier
