= Naborr =

20th-century Arabian stallion

- *Naborr (Note: An asterisk in front of an Arabian horse's name indicates that the horse was foaled outside of the United States and imported to the U.S.)
- Breed: Arabian horse
- Sire: Negatiw
- Grandsire: Naseem
- Dam: Lagodna
- Maternal grandsire: Posejon
- Sex: Stallion
- Foaled: April 13, 1950
- Country: Foaled in Russia, imported to Poland, to US 1963
- Color: Gray
- Breeder: Tersk Stud
- Owner: Tom Chauncey

Record
- 8:2-0-0

Major wins
- "Certificate of the first class", Moscow, 1954

Honors
- "Living Legend Stallion" 1970

Naborr (April 3, 1950 – November 9, 1977), originally named Nabor, was a gray Arabian stallion foaled in Russia at the Tersk Stud. He was sired by Negatiw, a Russian-bred stallion with Crabbet ancestry, out of the Polish-bred mare Lagodna. After establishing himself on the race track and show ring in the former USSR, Naborr was exported to Poland, where he lived for seven years, and from there was purchased for import to the United States by a wealthy Arabian horse breeder from Arizona, Anne McCormick. Upon her death, Naborr was sold in 1969 to Tom Chauncey and Wayne Newton for $150,000, which was at the time the highest price ever paid for an Arabian horse at auction. He went on to become a leading sire of champion Arabian horses in the United States and Canada.

== Life and career ==
Naborr was foaled at Russia's Tersk Stud on April 13, 1950, and was originally named Nabor. He was sired by the Russian-born stallion Negatiw (sometimes spelled Negativ) (Note: In the Polish language, a "w" is pronounced similarly to the English "v", original Russian names would have been spelled in the Cyrillic alphabet) and out of the mare Lagodna. He was a homozygous gray, (Note: The impact of being a homozygous gray is that, because the gray allele is dominant, all of Naborr's offspring were gray.) and was recorded by the Russian Arabian Stud Book as standing 150 centimetres (14.3 hands; 59 in). As a two-year-old, Nabor raced at Pyatigorsk and won two times out of eight starts. His highest recorded speeds were 1,500 metres (4,900 ft) in 1:54, 1,600 metres (5,200 ft) in 1:55, and 1,800 metres (5,900 ft) in 2:10. His accomplishments at the track qualified him to become a breeding stallion at Tersk. At age four, he was awarded a "certificate of the first class", equivalent to a Reserve Champion, at the All-Union Agricultural Fair in Moscow in a competition open to all breeds of horses. His sire Negatiw was the champion. Nabor sired nine foals in Russia, but only one, a colt, was registered.

In 1955, Nabor was sold to Poland. The Polish were rebuilding their Arabian breeding program following World War II, and wanted a stallion that would restore the Ibrahim sire line to their national studs. Ibrahim was a desert-bred stallion brought to Poland in 1907 by Count Joseph Potocki. The horse was killed in 1917 during the Bolshevik Revolution, (Note: Potocki's Antoniny stud farm was part of Russia by the time of World War I) and by the end of World War II, the sire line had been lost to Poland. It was preserved via Ibrahim's son Skowronek, who had been exported to England in 1912, and Skowronek was the great-grandsire of Nabor. In Poland, Nabor was first put to stud at the Albigowa State Stud, then in 1957 moved to the Michalow State Stud. While in Poland, he was noted for his docile temperament, intelligence, soundness, and Saklawi-style Arabian beauty: "dry, fine head with expressive eye, swan neck and milk-white hair unusual for his age ... he resembled the Arabian horses painted by Juliusz Kossak, the best painter of oriental horses." In 1962, the Poles were also able to import his sire Negatiw.

Nabor stayed at Michalow until January 1963, when he was purchased and imported to America by the heiress Anne "Fifi" McCormick. (Note: McCormick had married Harold "Fowler" McCormick, Jr., chairman of the board of International Harvester. The couple had founded the McCormick Ranch in Scottsdale in 1943. Anne McCormick began breeding horses, and in 1948 bought her first Arabian stallion, Mustafa.) Upon arrival in America, Nabor's registered name became Naborr. Naborr came to America via ship, along with 15 other Polish-bred Arabians, including Bask. The voyage lasted 44 days and was rough because the ship encountered a storm at sea. They also ran low on hay. 13-year-old Naborr came through the trip fairly well but lost 50 pounds. One other horse, a mare, aborted her foal and died, and most of the other horses lost a great deal more weight than did Naborr. McCormick only stood Naborr to her own mares and those of a few select friends, and as a result, under McCormick's ownership, he only sired about 10 foals per year, a total of 82 foals. Because Naborr's stud book was closed to outside mares, breeders seeking his bloodlines returned to Poland and purchased several of his offspring bred there, including the mare *Dornaba and stallions *Gwalior, *Mirzaz, and *Aramus. A total of 27 of Naborr's offspring were imported from Poland to the United States.

When McCormick died at age 90, in 1969, the terms of her will called for her Arabians to be sold at public auction. In October, 1969 Tom Chauncey, a television station owner, rancher and horse breeder in the Phoenix area, agreed to team up with Wayne Newton and purchased Naborr at the McCormick estate auction. Chauncey paid $150,000, which at the time was the highest price ever paid for an Arabian horse at auction in America, and brought in Newton as a partner on the horse a month later. (Note: Prior to the sale, Newton had indicated that he would pay up to $40,000 for the horse, but was performing that day and missed the actual bidding.) Chauncey had previously bred Thoroughbreds and Quarter Horses, but already owned a few Arabians that he kept on his ranch. He initially stabled Naborr at Newton's more suitable barn, but built his own facility near Scottsdale, Arizona, and bought out Newton's share in 1971. In the same period, Newton formed a partnership with other Arabian breeders to purchase *Aramus, who was a son of Naborr. When Aramus was named National Champion Stallion in 1970, Naborr's stud fee was advertised at $10,000. That same year, Naborr was brought to the U.S. Arabian National Championship show and honored before the spectators there as one of 10 "Living Legends". In 1975 he was the fourth-leading sire of champions in the United States. Under Chauncey's ownership, he sired another 260 foals.

His high purchase price and coverage in mainstream national news outlets was credited as the beginning of a "bubble" of high auction prices paid for Arabian horses. Naborr had the distinction of being the first Russian-bred Arabian to have offspring registered in the United States. Due to his importation from Poland, he could be registered, as the Russian Arabian Stud Book was not approved by the World Arabian Horse Association until 1978. Naborr died on November 9, 1977; he was 27 years old. In his final year of life, he sired 36 foals, the last of which was born on October 1, 1978. (Note: the gestation period for horses is approximately 11 months.)

== Offspring and legacy ==
Combining his imported offspring and American-born foals, Naborr sired 365 horses registered in the United States. By the end of 1967, 61 of his offspring had won 693 show championships among them. The number of wins later doubled. In 1981, Naborr was tied for third as the leading sire of U.S. and Canadian National Champions. By 1999, statistics showed that 1130 championships had been won by 121 of his offspring. (Note: Most Arabian horses do not begin showing under saddle until age three at the earliest, but may be competitive in some disciplines well into their teens and occasionally beyond.) Of these horses, 46 of them earned Top Ten or higher honors at the U.S. and Canadian National Arabian Championships.

Naborr's winning offspring included his son Kaborr, who was a Canadian National Champion Stallion in halter and western pleasure, and reserve U.S. National Champion stallion as well as Senior European Male Champion at the Salon du Cheval in France in 1979. Other sons and daughters had championship careers as well. The Naborr son *Aramus, foaled in Poland and imported to the United States, became a U.S. and Canadian National Champion Stallion in both halter and performance, showing in formal driving and as a park horse. Naborr's son Gai-Adventure was U.S. National Champion stallion in 1974. His daughter, *Dornaba, was a U.S. and Canadian National Champion Mare. Other national champion offspring in performance disciplines included Riffle, a park and formal driving horse, and Ibn Naborr, Canadian National Champion Stock Horse.

== Pedigree ==
Through his sire Negatiw, Naborr was a grandson of the Skowronek son Naseem, who had been sold to Russia in 1936 by Lady Wentworth of the Crabbet Arabian Stud for a price estimated at £50,000. His dam Lagodna was foaled in Poland and the Russians captured her and a number of other Arabians during World War II and brought her to Tersk. Also amongst the captured horses were Naborr's ancestors Taraszcza, Gazella II, and Enwer Bey. Via his sire line to Skowonek, as well as through Lagodna's sire Posejdon, and the mare Ikwa, Naborr carries three crosses to the stallion Ibrahim.

Pedigree of Naborr
Sire Negatiw	Naseem	Skowronek	Ibrahim
Sire Negatiw	Naseem	Skowronek	Jaskoulka
Sire Negatiw	Naseem	Nasra	Daoud
Sire Negatiw	Naseem	Nasra	Nefisa
Sire Negatiw	Taraszcza	Enwer Bey	Abu Mlech
Sire Negatiw	Taraszcza	Enwer Bey	Koalicja
Sire Negatiw	Taraszcza	Gazella II	Koheilan
Sire Negatiw	Taraszcza	Gazella II	Abra
Dam Lagodna	Posejdon	Ibrahim	Heijer
Dam Lagodna	Posejdon	Ibrahim	Lafitte
Dam Lagodna	Posejdon	Najada	Sultan
Dam Lagodna	Posejdon	Najada	Norwela
Dam Lagodna	Obra	Hardy	Ganges I
Dam Lagodna	Obra	Hardy	Gazella II
Dam Lagodna	Obra	Ikwa	Koheilan
Dam Lagodna	Obra	Ikwa	Elstera

== Sources ==
- Carpenter, Marian K. (1999). Arabian legends : outstanding Arabian stallions and mares. Colorado Springs, Colo.: Western Horseman. pp. 72–79. ISBN 0911647481.
- Edwards, Gladys Brown (1973). The Arabian: War Horse to Show Horse (Revised Collector's ed.). Covina, California: Rich Publishing, Inc.
