= Aun (surname) =

Family name

Origin
- Language: Estonian
- Meaning: a type of traditional elongated stack made of hay, cereals, or peat, for the collection and drying of crops
- Region of origin: Estonia

Other names
- Related names: Rõuk, Hakk, Naber

Aun is an Estonian surname derived from aun, a type of traditional elongated stack made of hay, cereals, straw, or peat, for the collection and drying of crops.

As of 1 January 2021, 214 men and 228 women have the surname Aun in Estonia. Aun ranks 262nd for men and 277th for women in the distribution of surnames in Estonia. The surname Aun is the most common in Hiiu County, where 12.61 per 10,000 inhabitants of the county bear the surname. Notable people bearing the surname Aun include:

- Anu Aun (born 1980), film director, producer, and screenwriter
- Arvo Aun (born 1950), artist and mathematician
- Elise Aun (1863–1932), poet
- Rein Aun (1940–1995), track and field athlete
