= Negatiw =

Russian-bred Arabian Horse stallion

- Negatiw
- Breed: Arabian horse
- Sire: Naseem
- Grandsire: Skowronek
- Dam: Taraszcza
- Maternal grandsire: Enwer Bay
- Sex: Stallion
- Foaled: August 5, 1945
- Country: Foaled in Russia, imported to Poland in 1962
- Color: Gray
- Breeder: Tersk Stud

Record
- 1/4:2–0–0

Major wins
- "Champion Stallion", Moscow, 1954

Negatiw, sometimes anglicized Negativ, (Note: In the Polish language, a "w" is pronounced similarly to the English "v", original Russian names would have been spelled in the Cyrillic alphabet) (August 5, 1945 – 1973) was a gray Russian-born Arabian stallion. He was sired by Naseem, a Skowronek son bred in England, out of the Polish-bred mare, Taraszcza. Negatiw was credited as the stallion that returned the Ibrahim sire line to Poland. He is also regarded as the most internationally influential grandson of Skowronek.

== Life and career ==
Negatiw, was foaled at Russia's Tersk Stud in 1945. He was sired by the Crabbet-bred stallion Naseem, out of the Polish-bred mare, Taraszcza. Negatiw was recorded to be 14.1 hands (57 inches, 145 cm) tall. Andrez Krzysztalowicz of Poland's Janów Podlaski Stud Farm described Negatiw as "Extremely dry and refined, with a small, chiseled head accented by beautifully large, dark and luminous eyes and small ears. His legs were relatively correct (though slightly sickle-hocked) and his back and topline were strong and a bit long. As a stallion, he was strikingly refined and distinguished – he represented a rare example of perfection."

He was the winner of two races in Russia and at the age of 9, in 1954, he was also named the "Champion Stallion" at the All-Union Agricultural Exhibition in Moscow. Negatiw was put to stud, and stayed at Tersk for 11 years, siring 105 foals. However, his offspring did not do so well on the racetrack, therefore in 1962, at the age of 17, he was sold to Poland. There, his name was changed from Negativ, to Negatiw.

In Poland, Negatiw was bred to many more mares, where his offspring were much more successful. He was afterwards used as a stud in two different places in Poland: Janów Podlaski Stud Farm (1962–1968) and Michalow Stud (1969–1973). For the rest of his lifetime, he was bred to other mares, up until his death in 1973. Negatiw was 28 years old.

== Offspring and legacy ==
At Tersk, some of Negatiw's best-siring sons were Suvenir and *Salon, (Note: An asterisk in front of an Arabian horse's name indicates that the horse was foaled outside of the United States and imported to the U.S.) who was also the latter sire of both *Moment, the head sire of Tersk, and U.S. and Canadian Champion Stallion *Muscat. Bandos was one of the most legendary horses foaled by Negatiw. He was out of the mare Polish-bred mare, Bandola, known as the "Queen of Poland." Bandos went on to sire 3 Derby winners and 10 Polish National Champions. Negatiw's highly acclaimed son, Naborr, came to the All-Union Agricultural Fair in Moscow with him in 1954, and was awarded a "certificate of the first class", equivalent to a Reserve Champion. He went on to become a leading sire of champion horses in the United States and Canada.

== Pedigree ==
Negatiw's sire, Naseem, was a Skowronek son who had been sold to Russia in 1936 by Lady Wentworth of the Crabbet Arabian Stud for a price estimated at £50,000. At the beginning of World War II, his dam, Taraszcza, was taken to Tersk by the Russian army, alongside a number of other Polish mares. Enwer Bay and Gazella ll were some of his other ancestors included in the group taken by the Russians.

Pedigree of Negatiw
Sire Naseem	Skowronek	Ibrahim	Heijer
Sire Naseem	Skowronek	Ibrahim	Lafitte
Sire Naseem	Skowronek	Jaskolka	Rymnik
Sire Naseem	Skowronek	Jaskolka	Epopeja
Sire Naseem	Nasra	Daoud	Abu Mlech
Sire Naseem	Nasra	Daoud	Koalicja
Sire Naseem	Nasra	Nefisa	Hadban
Sire Naseem	Nasra	Nefisa	Dajania
Dam Taraszcza	Enwer Bey	Abu Mlech	Mlech I
Dam Taraszcza	Enwer Bey	Abu Mlech	Lania
Dam Taraszcza	Enwer Bey	Koalicja	Koheilan IV
Dam Taraszcza	Enwer Bey	Koalicja	238 Amurath-
Dam Taraszcza	Gazella II	Kohejlan	
Dam Taraszcza	Gazella II	Abra	Anvil
Dam Taraszcza	Gazella II	Abra	Lania
