= Wygoda, Gmina Janów Podlaski =

Wygoda
- Village
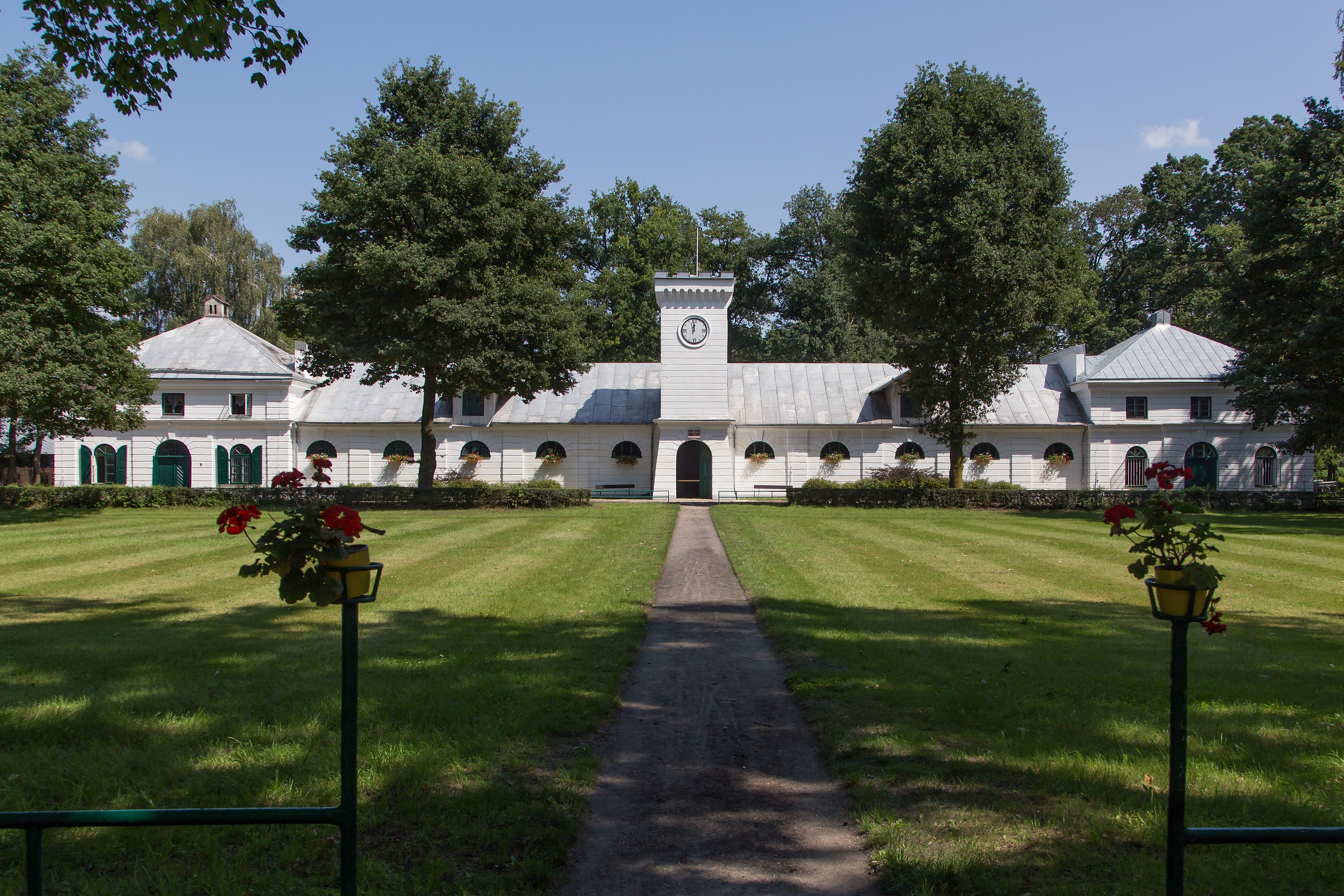
- Janów Podlaski Stud Farm in Wygoda

- Location within Poland
- Coordinates: 52°12′22″N 23°14′4″E
- Country: Poland
- Voivodeship: Lublin
- County: Biała
- Gmina: Janów Podlaski
- Time zone: UTC+1 (CET)
  - Summer (DST): UTC+2 (CEST)
- Vehicle registration: LBI

Wygoda [vɨˈɡɔda] is a village in the administrative district of Gmina Janów Podlaski, within Biała County, Lublin Voivodeship, in eastern Poland, close to the border with Belarus.

The renowned Janów Podlaski Stud Farm is located in the village. It is listed as a Historic Monument of Poland.
