= Al-Naber =

Al-Naber is the surname of three siblings:

- Natasha Al-Naber (born 1995), Jordanian footballer
- Stephanie Al-Naber (born 1988), Jordanian footballer
- Yousef Al-Naber (born 1989), Jordanian footballer

== See also ==
- Naber, another surname
