= Tersk Stud =

Russian horse breeding farm for Arabian horses

The Tersk Stud is a horse stud farm, and it was used to restore the Russian horse population, which suffered heavy losses during the 1917-1923 Revolution. It was officially established on 11 February 1921, on the orders of Marshal Semyon Budyonny.

== Early history ==
In the 1880s, Count Sergei Aleksandrovich Stroganov and his brother-in-law Prince Aleksandr Grigorievich Shcherbatov found a spot at the foot of Mount Zmeika (“small snake” in Russian) in the Northern Caucasus they felt was ideal for establishing a horse breeding farm. The two traveled to the Middle East in 1889 and purchased several purebred Arabian horses for use in their new breeding program. Stroganov also purchased horses from Crabbet Arabian Stud in England, including the mares Makbula and Sobha, and the stallion Mesaoud, who came from Crabbet Stud by way of Kleniewski Stud in modern-day Poland.

== Russian Revolution & Civil War ==
Shcherbatov died in 1915. During the 1917 Russian Revolution, Stroganov fled to Paris where he remained with his family until he died in 1923. The Stroganov estate was seized by Russian revolutionaries and none of the Arabians of the Stroganov and Shcherbatov programs are known to have survived the Russian Revolution. In 1921 Marshal Semyon Budyonny, an accomplished horseman and cavalry officer, ordered two farms near Mineralnye Vody, the former Stroganov breeding farm and the nearby farm of White Army General Sultan Ghirey-Klych to be renamed and used for restoring the devastated Russian horse population. Today the stud is known as Tersky Horse-Breeding Farm No. 169. There is no indication Stroganov and Shcherbatov or their breeding stock had any involvement in the founding of the Soviet-run Tersk Stud.

== Soviet-era Arabian horse program ==
Arabians were re-introduced to the new Tersk Stud in 1925 and the first French Arabian imports arrived in 1930. These included the stallion Kann and six mares, most notable of which was Carabine. Koheilan IV was imported from Hungary. The French horses had generally good conformation but were lacking Arabian type, so the stud’s managers searched for quality breeding stock with the characteristic Arabian refinement. In 1936, a shipment of 25 horses came from Crabbet Arabian Stud in England, some of which were descended from horses that had lived at the Stroganov and Shcherbatov stud and perished during the revolution. There were six stallions in the purchase, of which Naseem (a son of Skowronek and great-grandson of Mesaoud) was the most influential. Among the mares, Rissalma, Rixalina, and Star of the Hills left a significant impression on the breed. Tersk attempted to purchase Skowronek himself from Crabbet Stud, but he was not for sale.

World War II added significant bloodstock to Tersk, at the expense of Poland’s Arabian breeding program. In 1939 the Soviets removed many of the best Arabians bred at Janów Podlaski Stud Farm in Poland and marched them over 1,000 miles back to Tersk Stud. Among the horses making the trek was Mammona, a bay suckling filly whose name meant “treasure” in Polish. Mammona’s sire, Ofir, was also in the group of horses moved to Tersk. He had already left his mark on the breed by siring the famous "three Ws" in Poland: Witraz (the sire of *Bask), *Witez II, and Wielki Szlem. Ofir did not sire the same caliber of horses at Tersk as he did in Poland.

In 1941, to evade the advancing German troops, the Tersk horses were evacuated to western Kazakhstan where they faced harsh weather and terrain. However, they returned to Tersk in 1943 with few losses.

Mammona, the treasure of Tersk

The Ofir daughter, Mammona, had an extensive influence upon the Tersk breeding program. She produced the stallion Pomeranets, who influenced both the Arabian and Trakehner breeds; the mares Nomenklatura (dam of Nabeg), Monopolia (dam of Monogramma), Metropolia (dam of *Menes), Malpia (dam of *Muscat, 1980 U.S. & Canadian National Champion Stallion, and *Moment), and *Magnolia (dam of *Marsianin, 1981 U.S. National Champion Stallion).

Aside from Ofir, other notable stallions brought to Tersk from Poland included Piolun, the sire of Priboj (out of Rissalma, who had been purchased from Crabbet Arabian Stud); and Taki Pan, the sire of the mare Taktika, who produced the mare Ptashka and the stallions *Pietuszok and Topol (all by Priboj). Topol's son Naftalin sired very good racehorses, including Aspect, who won 28 of 39 races. *Pietuszok was exported to Poland in 1958, where he sired successful racehorses like Wosk, *Orzel, and Wilma (the dam of *Wiking, whose offspring have earned over $8 million in purses).

Another of the confiscated Polish mares, Taraszcza, was bred to the Crabbet-bred stallion Naseem at Tersk and foaled a grey colt named Negativ in 1945. Negativ sired 12 foal crops in Russia, but because they did not excel on the racetrack he was sold to Poland in 1962, renamed “Negatiw,” and sired better racehorses out of the Polish mares.

Negativ’s best-siring sons at Tersk were Suvenir and *Salon, the latter the sire of both the U.S. and Canadian National Champion Stallion *Muscat and Tersk head sire *Moment. Another Negativ son, Nabor (later renamed *Naborr when he was imported to the U.S.), sired just 9 registered foals at Tersk, apparently because his offspring were considered too delicate for the Tersk program, and was exported to Poland in 1955. The Poles sought a stallion of the Ibrahim sire line, and had hoped to purchase Negativ from Tersk but were unable at the time, but were satisfied to own his son Nabor instead. Nabor was exported to the U.S. in 1963, becoming the first Tersk-bred Arabian to go to the States. *Naborr was owned in the United States by Anne McCormack, and then upon her death was purchased at auction by Tom Chauncey and entertainer Wayne Newton.

None of Negativ’s Tersk-bred daughters had a significant influence on the Tersk program.

After World War II, Tersk imported a few stallions from Poland: Arax in 1958, Semen in 1962, and Elfur (a full brother to *El Paso) in 1972. Of these stallions, Arax had the greatest impact on Tersk’s program, siring the influential stallion Nabeg and a number of quality daughters.

Nabeg's most influential daughters include the U.S. National Top Ten Mare *Poznan, and Pesnianka, a dam of race and show champions in Europe.

Nabeg’s sons include the stallions *Menes, *Pesniar, and *Nariadni, all three imported to the U.S. Peleng, another son, was sold for $3.2 million but tested positive for piroplasmosis (Equine babesiosis) and was never permitted to enter the U.S. Nabeg can also be found in Trakehner pedigrees through some of his sons and daughters. Unfortunately Nabeg died young, having left only eight foal crops.

In 1958, the Sid Abouhom son Nil (named Azmy in Egypt) was a gift to the Soviet Union from Egypt in appreciation for the USSR’s assistance in funding the Aswan Dam. Nil sired only 16 foals before his untimely death in 1960, but still left a lasting impression on the Tersk program. His loss was unfortunate because, based on his structure and brief siring record, Nil could have been as significant to Tersk as his successor. In 1963, the Egyptian government gave another stallion to the Soviet Union, Raafat by Nazeer, who was renamed Aswan by the Soviets in honor of the dam project.

Aswan as a young stallion in Egypt

Aswan had a profound influence on the Tersk breeding program. As a whole, the broodmare band at Tersk had generally good structure but lacked some elements of Arabian type. Aswan introduced a more extreme dished head with large nostrils, large expressive eye, long level croup, and high tail carriage. He also had obvious faults, such as offset front knees, post-legged back legs, a long low back, a "wasp-waist," and a thick neck and throatlatch. But because Aswan’s faults were different than the Tersk mares’ faults, they often complemented each other well.

Aswan sired 299 offspring over 20 seasons at Tersk, more than any other stallion in the stud’s history. Some of Aswan’s best-known sons included Palas (out of a daughter of Nil, the first stallion given to the USSR by Egypt), who was exported to Poland and became a head sire at Janów Podlaski Stud Farm for many years; Kilimanjaro, a German National Reserve Champion who sired champions in North America and Europe; Patron, who sired the U.S. and Canadian National Champion Stallion *Padron before his untimely death; and Plakat, a European champion who sired many champions himself.

Aswan excelled at siring broodmares. Examples include Pesnia, the dam of *Pesniar, who was purchased for $1 million and imported to the U.S. in 1981; Molva, called Aswan’s most beautiful and best-producing daughter by former Tersk director Alexander Ponomarev and the dam of Wympel; and Karinka, a full sister to Kilimanjaro, an accomplished race mare and the dam of Russian Derby winner and European Champion Stallion Drug.

The *Menes son Balaton, out of the Aswan daughter Panagia, was foaled in 1982 at Tersk and was immediately identified as the stud’s next great hope. Balaton became one of the youngest stallions to become a head sire at Tersk at just three years of age, and Tersk Director Alexander Ponomarev called him "the horse of the century at Tersk" after his first foal crop arrived.

The Balaton son Kubinec, out of the *Muscat daughter Kosmetika, was foaled at Tersk in 1987. A chestnut with a wide blaze going all the way over his nose and lips, Kubinec’s white markings weren't considered acceptable in the Tersk breeding program. According to Dr. O.A. Balakshin of the All Russian Research Institute of Horse Breeding, “Too many horses now have white markings on their head and legs. This is undesirable and should be eliminated by selection.”. Kubinec was sold in 1991 and began making his mark in European show rings. He was named German National, European, and World Champion Stallion as well as European Conference of Arab Horse Organizations (ECAHO) "Five Star Stallion" and his offspring are desirable around the world today.

In the mid-1980s, Tersk Stud introduced a few different outcross stallions, such as the Polish imports Gvizd ("Gwizd" in Poland) and Harfiaj ("Harfiarz" in Poland) and the English-bred pure Spanish Esplendor. Gvizd, Harfiaj, and Esplendor left Tersk but some of their descendants were used in the Tersk breeding program. Of the three outcross stallions, Gvizd had the greatest influence through a few of his daughters and his son, Negasimyi, who later became a sire of racehorses at Tersk in the mid-1990s. Gvizd's daughter Purga produced the stallion Padishah (by race winner Drug), who won several halter championships in Europe in the early 2000s. Gvizd also sired Pogojii, winner of four stakes races in Russia.

== Post-1991 stud history ==
The dissolution of the Soviet Union in 1991 brought Tersk's future into question.

== Tersk racing legacy ==
=== Influence of American buyers ===
By the mid-1980s, Russian Arabians were viewed as an exotic and profitable business in the U.S. Notable examples include Pesniar, who was purchased from Tersk in 1981 for $1 million, and Peleng, who was purchased for well in excess of $3 million in 1985. Before American-purchased Tersk Arabians were eligible for registration in the U.S., Howard F. Kale traded two Standardbred stallions worth $1 million each to Tersk Stud for the stallion *Muscat.

Russian horses also retained their value within the U.S. A half-interest in the aged broodmare *Nariadnaia was sold at auction in the U.S. for $580,000 in 1983 and the stallion *Abdullahhh was sold for $3.2 million at a U.S. auction in 1984. The Soviets noticed the inflated prices that westerners were willing to pay for their horses and accordingly set high reserves on their auction lots.

Prices began to come down at the annual Tersk auction starting in 1985 and the values of all big-investment Arabian horses dropped dramatically after the U.S. tax laws were changed in 1986. After that point, breeding "straight Russian" Arabians, or horses that were descended only from Tersk-bred horses, was not as common in the U.S. Some American breeders increasingly crossed Russian-bred horses with other lines to produce more exotic type and movement, while Arabian sport horse breeders outcrossed to Russian lines for their athletic ability.

=== Acceptance by the American Arabian registry ===
The Arabian Horse Registry of America (AHRA) did not approve the Russian Stud Book until 1978, meaning any Arabians imported to the U.S. directly from Tersk Stud were not permitted to be registered. The reason given by the Registry in a letter to Mr. Ed Tweed was “we mustn’t deal with the Russians” after Tweed attempted to register the Tersk-bred mares *Napaika and *Palmira and the stallion *Park in 1963. Tweed argued that the Tersk-bred *Naborr was registered by AHRA that same year with no problems, to which the registry replied that a Russian-bred horse may be registered by AHRA as long as the horse was owned in England or Poland for several years before its sale to the U.S. (*Naborr was sold by Tersk to Poland and used there for a number of years before he was imported to the U.S.) “We (Americans) are not as intimately acquainted with the Russians as the Poles and British, and we need not deal with them.”

AHRA eventually accepted and approved the registering of Arabians imported directly from the Soviet Union in 1978, and *Napaika and *Palmira were registered that same year.

== Tersk environment ==
Tersk Stud is located in the Caucasus Mountains in southern European Russia. The nearby town, Mineralnye Vody, means "mineral waters" and is renowned as a spa town. The weather is mild, ranging from 40 degrees Fahrenheit in the winter to nearly 80 degrees Fahrenheit in the summer.

While the weather is not harsh, the mares and foals at Tersk Stud live a rugged life outdoors most of the time. There are no fences around the stud, so mounted watchmen follow and monitor the herds night and day. The horses are brought into the barn twice each day to be fed and checked, but otherwise they are free to enjoy the open spaces.

== Breeding operations ==
Tersk is best known for its purebred Arabian horses, but it has also hosted breeding programs for Akhal-Tekes, Terskys, Kabardins, and Dons. All Terskys were transferred to nearby Stavropol Stud in 1945 to continue the development of the new breed.

From the beginning of its history, the stud has tested its horses on the racetrack. Tersk Arabians are sent to the Pyatigorsk racetrack at the age of two and may race one or two seasons. The best performers race on Sundays, with two-year-olds running 1,400 meters and older horses running 1,600 and 1,800 meters. The top individuals may be used for breeding at Tersk or return to the racetrack for another season. Many others will be sold at the age of three.

While race records are important to the Tersk breeding program, Dr. Balakshin stated “…good racing results are not the only criterion for selecting young stock for breeding purposes. Excellent runners which deviate from breed type may be used for limited breeding or else they are eliminated from selection.”

Any horse used for breeding at Tersk is required to be rated “Elite” or “Grade I” in the Russian Stud Book. Horses that receive lower grades are sent to other studs or sold.

The current stud director is Vladimir Tolmachyov.

== See also ==
- Horses in Russia
