= Nabors (surname) =

Nabors is a surname. Notable people with the surname include:

- Jack Nabors (1887–1923), American baseball player
- Jim Nabors (1930–2017), American actor, singer and comedian
- Rachel Nabors (born 1985), American cartoonist, artist and graphic novelist
- Rob Nabors (born 1971), American political advisor
