= Witez II =

20th-century Arabian stallion from Poland

- Witez II
- Breed: Arabian
- Sire: Ofir (PASB)
- Grandsire: Kuhalian-Haifi (PASB)
- Dam: Federacja (PASB)
- Maternal grandsire: Burgas (PASB)
- Sex: Stallion
- Foaled: 1938
- Country: Poland
- Color: Bay
- Breeder: Janów Podlaski Stud Farm
- Owner: U.S. Remount, Earle E. and Frances Hurlbutt

Honors
- 1951 Grand Champion Southern California All-Arabian Show, 1953 Pacific Coast Champion Stallion
- Last updated on: January 13, 2008.

Witez II (April 1, 1938 – June 9, 1965) was a bay Arabian stallion foaled at the Janów Podlaski Stud Farm in Poland. He spent his early years at Janów at a time when Poland was under occupation by Nazi Germany before ultimately arriving in the United States in 1945, where he lived for the remainder of his life until his death. His name came from an archaic Polish word meaning "chieftain, knight, prince and hero."

== Ancestry ==
Witez II was by Ofir out of Federacja. Ofir was by the desert-bred stallion Kuhalian-Haifi, foaled in 1923, who was imported from the Jauf region of the Arabian Peninsula by Prince Roman Sanguszko of the Gumniska stud. Seeking an outcross for his mares, Sanguszko sent Bogdan Zientarski, accompanied by Carl Raswan, to buy horses from the desert in 1931. Kuhalian-Haifi died in 1935, having only sired 14 foals, of whom Ofir is the best-known. Federacja was a Polish-bred mare with bloodlines tracing to both Polish breeding and that of the Babolna stud of Hungary.

The 1938 foal crop was Ofir's first, and contained three colts that became sires of significance in the Arabian breed: Witez II; Witraz (Ofir x Makata), who was the sire of Bask; and the noted broodmare sire, Wielki Szlem (Ofir x Elegantka). During World War II, Ofir and Federacja were among the horses of Janów that were taken by the Russians during the Soviet invasion of Poland. Ofir's daughter Mammona also made the trek from Janów to Tersk Stud as a suckling foal and later became a dam of significance in the USSR.

== Early years ==
Witez II was only a yearling when Nazi Germany invaded Poland in 1939. With both the Soviet Union and Germany occupying the country, the Janów stud was temporarily evacuated. However, though Janów was on the German side of the Curzon line, the Russian military nonetheless confiscated most of the mature breeding stock as spoils of war. Witez II, along with the bulk of the young horses, avoided this fate and ultimately was returned to Janów, which was soon under the management of the German military. As young horse, he was put into race training, but because of wartime cancellation of horse racing during the occupation of Poland, he was not taken to the track. Instead, he was put to stud, first at Janów, and then was taken to Hostau in what today is the Czech Republic, where the Nazis had gathered significant bloodstock of all different breeds from across the Third Reich.

General George S. Patton, commander of the U.S. 3rd Army, was a lifelong horseman who competed in Modern Pentathlon at the 1912 Olympic Games. He had been tipped off by Alois Podhajsky of the Spanish Riding School that a significant number of Lipizzans and Thoroughbreds, as well as Arabian horses were at Hostau. When Hostau fell behind Soviet lines, captured German officers, under interrogation by U.S. Army Captain Ferdinand Sperl, reported the location of the stud farm and asked the Americans to rescue the horses before they fell into Soviet hands, because it was feared they would be slaughtered for horsemeat. Patton issued orders, and on April 28, 1945, Colonel Charles H. Reed, Sperl's superior officer, with members of Troops A, C and F of the 2nd Cavalry Regiment, conducted a raid behind Soviet lines and accepted the surrender of the Germans at Hostau. Reed later said that the surrender was "more a fiesta than a military operation, as the German troops drew up an honor guard and saluted the American troops as they came in." Being one of the relatively few horses at Hostau who was broke to ride, Witez II carried a rider throughout the evacuation and came through sound.

== Life in America ==
At the end of the war, Witez II and other horses captured from the Nazis were shipped to the United States, much to the dismay of the Poles, who had hoped to recover the horses they had lost. The journey by ship from Europe to America was quite rough, but the horses arrived safely in Newport News, Virginia in late 1945, and spent the winter at the U.S. Army Remount station at Front Royal, Virginia. In early 1946, Witez II and the bulk of the imported Arabians were shipped to the Army Remount station at the former W.K. Kellogg Arabian Ranch in Pomona, California, where he stood at stud until 1948. In that year, the remount service was put under the authority of the United States Department of Agriculture, and the horses were sent off for auction.

Witez II was purchased in 1949 by Earle E. and Frances Hurlbutt of the Calarabia Ranch near Calabasas, California, who owned him for the remainder of his life. Because the remount horses had been shipped to a consolidated site in Oklahoma for sale, Hurlbutt flew to Fort Reno, Oklahoma, specifically to bid on the stallion, and paid $8100 for the horse. Witez II lived on the Hurlbutt ranch for many years, but left California from 1960 to 1964 on a lease to Burr Betts of the Betts Circle 2 Ranch in Parker, Colorado. He returned to Calarabia for the final year of his life.

Although not shown a great deal in America, he was 1951 Grand Champion at the Southern California All-Arabian show in Pomona, one of the largest shows of the day, and then Pacific Coast Champion Stallion and overall grand champion in 1953, at the age of 15, winning one of the most prestigious awards for Arabian horses at the time. He sired 223 foals, of whom 10 had been born outside the USA prior to his importation. His offspring included 16 national winners in both halter and performance, which was particularly notable because the first U.S. National Championship show was not held until 1958. His daughter Ronteza made a significant mark in open competition, winning the 1961 World Champion Reined Cow Horse at the Cow Palace in San Francisco, defeating 50 horses of all breeds.

Witez II died while sleeping peacefully in his pasture at Calarbia, June 1965, shortly after his 27th birthday.

== Pedigree ==
Kuhailan Kharas (desertbred)
Kuhalian-Haifi (PASB); Imp. Arabia, 1931
Kuhaila-Haifi (desertbred)
Ofir (PASB) (Polish Arabian Stud Book)
Abu-Mlech
Dziwa (PASB)
Zulejma
Witez II; 1938 bay stallion
Obejan-Szerrak (desertbred)
Burgas (PASB)
Seglavi-Dzedran (desertbred)
Federacja (PASB)
Koheilan IV (ASBB); Babolna Stud, Hungary
Koalicja (PASB), Imp Babolna, 1919
Amurath II

== See also ==
- History of Poland (1939–1945)
