= Bask (horse) =

- Bask, under saddle as a Park Horse, ridden by Gene LaCroix, Jr.
- Breed: Arabian
- Sire: Witraz (PASB)
- Grandsire: Ofir (PASB)
- Dam: Balalajka (PASB)
- Maternal grandsire: Amurath-Sahib (PASB)
- Sex: Stallion
- Foaled: February 9, 1956
- Died: July 24, 1979 (aged 23)
- Country: Poland
- Color: Bay
- Breeder: Albigowa State Stud
- Owner: Dr. Eugene LaCroix, Lasma Arabians

Record
- 40-8-7-7, 4 years

Honors
- National Champion in halter and performance, sired 196 US or Canadian National Champions
- Last updated on: January 15, 2008.

Bask (February 9, 1956 – July 24, 1979), bred at the Albigowa State Stud in Poland, was a bay Arabian stallion who was imported into the United States in 1963 by Dr. Eugene LaCroix of Lasma Arabians and became a major sire of significance in the Arabian breed.

== Ancestry and early history ==
Bask's sire was Witraz, by the famed Ofir, who also sired Witez II. His dam was Balalajka, a daughter of Amurath-Sahib, deemed one of Poland's finest broodmares. He was sent to the race track, as it was typical in the time for horses to be sent to race as three-year-olds in order to determine the horse's athletic ability and soundness. In 1961, Albigowa ceased breeding Arabians, so after his horse racing career, Bask was sent to the Janów Podlaski Stud Farm.

Bask was a member of a "family" of considerable significance. All but one of Balalajka's progeny were by Witraz, and hence full siblings to Bask. His full sister Arfa was the dam of Argos, who was an important sire in Great Britain for Patricia Lindsay. His full sister Bandola was a mare of significance known as "the Queen of Poland", and was the dam of Bandos, by Negatiw. Bask's 3/4 sister Bachantka (by Wielki Szlem) had been imported to the United States in 1961 by Varian Arabians, where she was a Top Ten champion and major foundation mare for the Varian program.

Bask's name was chosen by Roman Pankiewicz, who was deputy manager of Albigowa at the time. Pankiewicz stated, "I always tried to give horses short, nice names, easy to translate – because their export had already begun in those times. And Bask [in Polish] is a courageous inhabitant of the Basque Country in Spain...the Basques are hard-working people. And so the horse became Bask. That name suited him like no other."

== Accomplishments in Poland and America ==
Having raced extensively in Poland, (4/40, 8/7/7) Bask was not evaluated as breeding stock until he was six. He never was put to stud in Poland, because the Janów Podlaski Stud Farm already stood a number of Witraz sons. For this reason, the Poles were also willing to sell him. He was actually scheduled to be gelded upon his return from the track, but instead was purchased for the relatively modest sum of $3000 by Dr. LaCroix, who initially intended to resell him to a Swedish breeder, but when that sale fell through, took the horse to America.

Upon arrival in the United States, after a very rough journey by ship, Bask was put to stud and retrained for the show ring. Bask earned his Legion of Merit from the International Arabian Horse Association (now Arabian Horse Association), and was the 1964 United States National Champion Halter stallion and the 1965 United States National Park horse Champion, one of only four Arabian stallions to ever win national championships in both halter and performance. He was also 1967 reserve national champion in the harness driving equivalent of park, formal driving. He is the only horse to have ever won dual national championships in halter and park.

== Influence on American breeding ==
Bask sired 1050 purebred Arabian foals, most in the time before artificial insemination was widespread in the horse industry, and 196 of these were United States or Canadian National Champions. His impact on American Arabian horse breeding has been described as "colossal".

Bask died on July 24, 1979, from colic. His body is now interred at the Kentucky Horse Park in its Champions Cemetery, and he is honored with a bronze statue in the lobby of the International Museum of the Horse.

== Pedigree ==
Kuhalian-Haifi (PASB) (Imp. Poland from Arabia, 1931 )
Ofir (PASB)
Dziwa (PASB)
Witraz (PASB) (Polish Arabian Stud Book)
Fetysz
Makata (PASB)
Gazella II
Bask++ 1956 bay
35 Amurath II
Amurath Sahib (PASB)
Sahiba
Balalajka (PASB)
Ibn Mahomet
Iwonka III (PASB) exported to the United States, 1945
Lysa
