= Naber =

Naber is a surname. Notable people with the surname include:

- Aaron Naber (born 1982), American mathematician
- Bob Naber (1929–1998), American basketball player
- Brian Naber (born 1949), American football coach
- Gijs Naber (born 1980), Dutch actor
- Hanna Naber (born 1971), German politician
- Herman Naber (1826–1909), American farmer, politician and jurist
- Johanna Naber (1859–1941), Dutch feminist, historian and author
- John Naber (born 1956), American swimmer
- Omar Naber (born 1981), Slovenian singer, songwriter and guitar player

== See also ==
- Alice Naber-Lozeman (born 1971), Dutch Olympic equestrian
- Al-Naber, another surname
- NABERS
- Nabor (disambiguation)
