= Skowronek (horse) =

20th-century Arabian stallion

- Lady Wentworth and Skowronek, her prized Arabian stallion
- Breed: Arabian
- Sire: Ibrahim
- Dam: Jaskoulka
- Sex: Stallion
- Foaled: 1908 or 1909
- Country: Foaled Poland, imported to England
- Colour: Gray
- Breeder: Count Jozef Potocki
- Owner: Lady Wentworth

Skowronek (a name meaning lark or skylark in Polish) was an Arabian stallion foaled in 1908 or 1909. He was bred by Count Józef Potocki who owned the Antoniny Stud in Poland. He was imported to England as a young horse. Upon purchase by Lady Wentworth, Skowronek became a foundation stallion at Lady Wentworth's Crabbet Arabian Stud. He was most often crossed on mares who were daughters or granddaughters of the stallion Mesaoud, another foundation stallion for Crabbet, who had been bred by Ali Pasha Sherif and imported from Egypt to England by Lady Wentworth's parents, Wilfrid and Lady Anne Blunt.

Skowronek was a gray stallion, on the small side, noted for his outstanding Arabian type, particularly his fine head and overall correct conformation. Lady Wentworth preferred to breed taller Arabians, but also wanted to preserve Arabian type and beauty, and Skowronek helped her accomplish this goal.

== Life ==
Skowronek was imported to England in 1913. The English painter Walter Winans bought Skowronek from Count Josef Potocki's Antoniny Stud in Poland. Winas had originally gone to Poland to hunt game at Count Potocki's private animal park, Piławin, located north of Antoniny, where he became enamored of Potocki's horses and upon the Count's recommendation, purchased Skowronek for £150. Winans used him as a model for several bronzes, then sold Skowronek to Mr. Webb Wares, "who rode him as a hack," and eventually sold him to H.V. Musgrave Clark, where he was shown and used at stud for the first time, coming to the attention of Lady Wentworth.

Skowronek as a young horse

Lady Wentworth bought Skowronek under circumstances that remain a bit confusing even today. Clark believed he was selling the horse to an American exporter, but at the last minute, the export was cancelled and Lady Wentworth turned out to be the owner of Skowronek. Clark was a rival Arabian breeder, and Lady Wentworth may have used the agent as a front; concerned that if Clark had known she was interested, he might have increased the price or refused to sell the horse at all. Clark was not happy with the result, and the two breeders had a somewhat cool relationship thereafter.

Skowronek became well known in England. Lady Wentworth later bragged that she once received a cable "from the Antipodes" addressed to "Skowronek, England." There was an unsubstantiated report that she turned down an offer of $250,000 from the Tersk Stud in the Soviet Union. The outcross of the original Crabbet stock with Skowronek was extremely successful, and Skowronek's offspring not only sold throughout England but were exported to Australia, Brazil, Egypt, Hungary, Spain, the Soviet Union, the United States.

Skowronek died in February 1930 at the age of 22. Lady Wentworth donated the stallion's skull and hide to the British Museum in London. She stated that "three experts" attended his necropsy and she stated that he had 17 pairs of ribs, five lumbar vertebrae and 16 tail vertebrae.

== Pedigree controversy ==
There was some controversy attached to Skowronek's pedigree, even in his lifetime. Lady Wentworth herself was satisfied that Skowronek was a purebred (or asil) Arabian. Some Arabian enthusiasts questioned if Skowronek was, in fact, a purebred for two reasons: First, his sire Ibrahim was desert-bred and imported to Poland via Turkey, but because of this route of importation, some claimed the stallion was actually a Turkoman horse. Lady Wentworth noted that Count Potocki registered Ibrahim as a "Kehilan Ajuz", thus acknowledging his purebred ancestry. Second, the Poles also crossed Arabian stallions on Thoroughbred and other non-Arabian mares, leading some researchers to question the accuracy of the stud books. Further confusion emerged because some European breeders commonly referred to horses by the location they were foaled, rather than by pedigree, and hence the occasional Potocki quote describing the horses at his stud as not "desert-bred" which may have referred to being foaled in Poland. Wentworth commented on this, stating, "Confusing locality of birth with blood of origin is indeed a favourite error..."

Skowronek's dam Jaskoulka, (variously known as Jakolka, Yascoulka or Yaskolka; from Polish jaskółka, "swallow"), was a Polish-bred purebred Arabian. The Poles had bred Arabians for centuries and kept careful pedigree records dating to at least 1800. Jaskoulka's pedigree shows that her sire was Rymnik and her dam was Epopeja (also spelled Epopeia or Epopya). The Bedouin tribe that produced the desert-bred Ibrahim was also identified, along with the strain name of his sire and dam. Nonetheless, due to this controversy, some private breeders' organizations, such as Al Khamsa, exclude descendants of Skowronek.

== Descendants ==
Skowronek produced 46 foals–23 colts and 23 fillies. 39 of these were named, and 27 appear in American Arabian pedigrees. Famous Skowronek offspring included his sons Raffles, purchased by the American breeder Roger Selby, and the stallions Raswan and Raseyn, exported to the W.K.Kellogg Arabian Stud in the United States. Another son, Naseem, often said to be Skowronek's finest offspring, was exported to the Tersk Stud in the Soviet Union, where descendants Negatiw and Naborr were foaled. Four of his daughters, including Reyna and Jalila, were sold to the stud of the Duke of Veragua in Spain.

== Pedigree ==
Pedigree of Skowronek, g. stallion Poland 1908 or 1909*
Sire Ibrahim, d.b.**	d.b.		
Sire Ibrahim, d.b.**	d.b.		
Dam Jaskoulka 1891	Rymnik g. 1876	Kortez; 1870	Cercle
Dam Jaskoulka 1891	Rymnik g. 1876	Kortez; 1870	Gonta
Dam Jaskoulka 1891	Rymnik g. 1876	Hama	Kohejlan-Abu-Argub
Dam Jaskoulka 1891	Rymnik g. 1876	Hama	Caramba
Dam Jaskoulka 1891	Epopeja; 1897	Derwisz; 1858	d.b.
Dam Jaskoulka 1891	Epopeja; 1897	Derwisz; 1858	d.b.
Dam Jaskoulka 1891	Epopeja; 1897	Lira; 1868	Obejan-Maciuk
Dam Jaskoulka 1891	Epopeja; 1897	Lira; 1868	Kreolka

* General Stud Book states 1909, Potocki pedigree states 1908

** "d.b." denotes "desert bred," indicating Middle East origin and no further named ancestors in the pedigree.

Ibrahim was imported to Poland by Potocki, who had pedigree records stating Ibrahim's sire was named "Heijer" and his dam, "Lafitte." However other sources state the sire's name was "Hejar". The dam was unnamed, but possibly of the Seglawi-Faliti strain.

== Sources ==
- Archer, Rosemary; Pearson, Colin; Covey, Cecil; Finke, Betty (1994). The Crabbet Arabian Stud : its history and influence (New ed.). Northleach: Alexander Heriot. ISBN 9780906382134.
- Edwards, Gladys Brown (1973). The Arabian: War Horse to Show Horse (Revised Collector's ed.). Covina, CA: Rich Publishing. "LC no 71-247969 (no ISBN listed)"
- Wentworth, Judith Anne Dorothea Blunt-Lytton (1979). The authentic Arabian horse and his descendants : three voices concerning the horses of Arabia (3rd ed.). Canaan, NY: Sporting Book Center. ISBN 0932748007.
