= Albigowa =

- Village
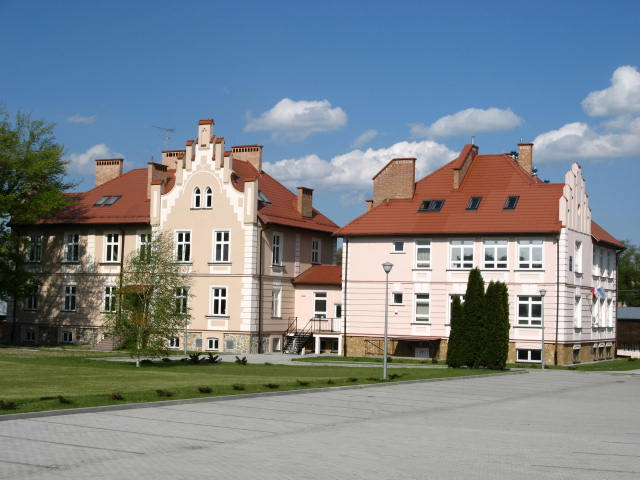
- Rzeszów University of Technology's Biotechnology Center in Albigowa

- Location within Poland
- Coordinates: 50°1′N 22°14′E
- Country: Poland
- Voivodeship: Subcarpathian
- County: Łańcut
- Gmina: Łańcut
- Population: 2,900

Albigowa [albiˈɡɔva] is a village in the administrative district of Gmina Łańcut, within Łańcut County, Subcarpathian Voivodeship, in south-eastern Poland.

In 2004 the village had a population of 2,900.

== Jewish history ==
Between 1942 and 1943, German troops murdered 62 people of Jewish origin in at least nine executions. In one of them, which happened in autumn 1943, 25 Jews were shot to death. In summer 1942, 10 local Jews were killed by the village of Kraczkowa.

== Arabian stud farm ==
After the World War II, a stud farm for Arabian horses was set up in Albigowa. It was the birthplace of Bask.

== See also ==
- Walddeutsche
