= Janów Podlaski Stud Farm =

Arabian horse stud farm in Poland

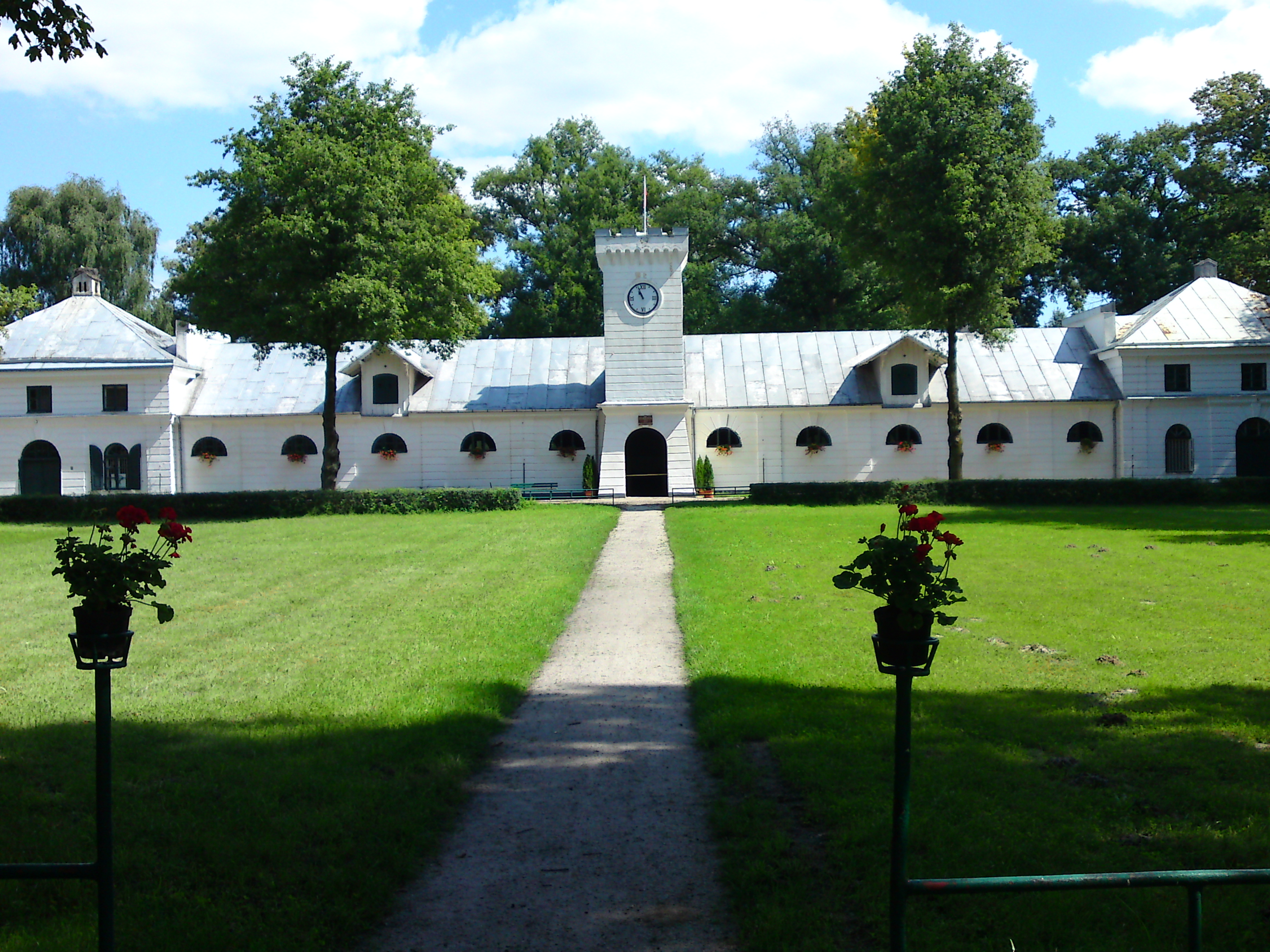
- Native name: Stadnina Koni Janów Podlaski
- Industry: Stud farm
- Founded: 1817
- Headquarters: Wygoda 3, 21-505 Janów Podlaski, Poland
- Website: skjanow.pl

Historic Monument of Poland
- Designated: 2017-11-22
- Reference no.: Dz. U. z 2017 r. poz. 2250

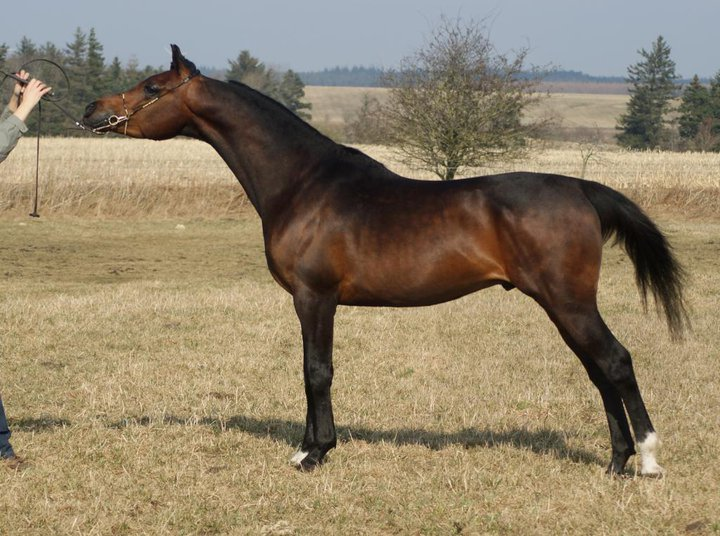
A horse bred at Janów

The Janów Podlaski Stud Farm (Polish: Stadnina Koni Janów Podlaski) is the oldest state stud farm in Poland, established in 1817 in Wygoda. The stud farm specializes in breeding Arabian and Anglo-Arabian horses. It has been an important stud farm for the Arabian horse breed for the last 200 years, despite being plundered in 1914 by the Russian Empire and in 1939 by the Soviet Union. The annual horse auction at Janów Podlaski, called Pride of Poland, is one of the major sales of Arabian purebred horses globally.

The stud farm is located in Wygoda near Janów, in a complex of classicist stables founded in 1817. It covers an area of 2,500 hectares, which is approximately 18% of the Gmina Janów Podlaski administrative district. Up until 1994, the stud farm operated as a state agricultural farm under the name (Stadnina Koni Janów Podlaski [Janów Podlaski Stud Farm] and then as the Stadnina Koni Skarbu Państwa Janów [Janów State Treasury Horse Stud Farm], and later to Stadnina Koni Janów Podlaski Sp. z o.o. [Janów Podlaski Stud Farm L.L.C.].

== History ==
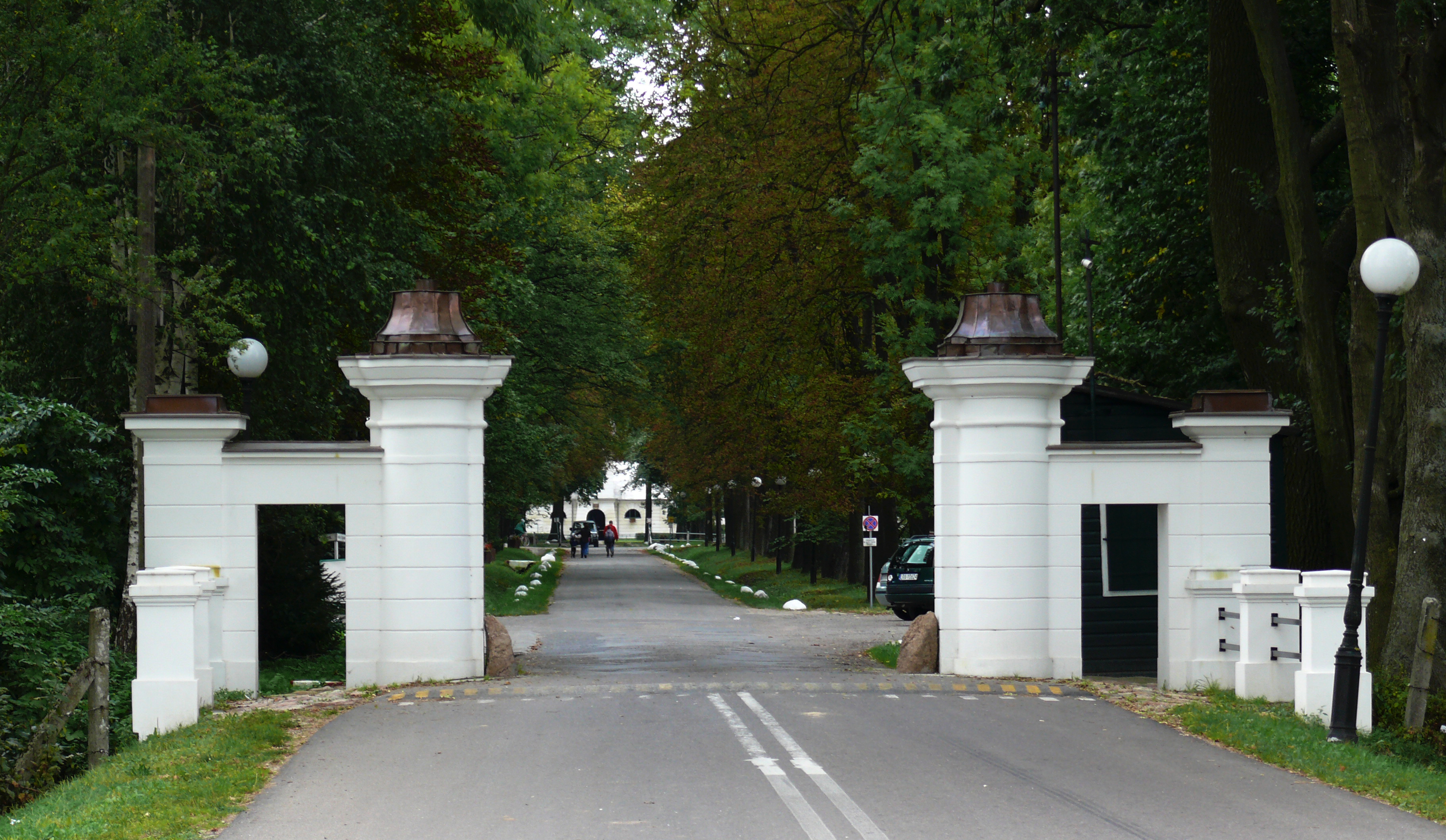
Entrance gate c. 1840

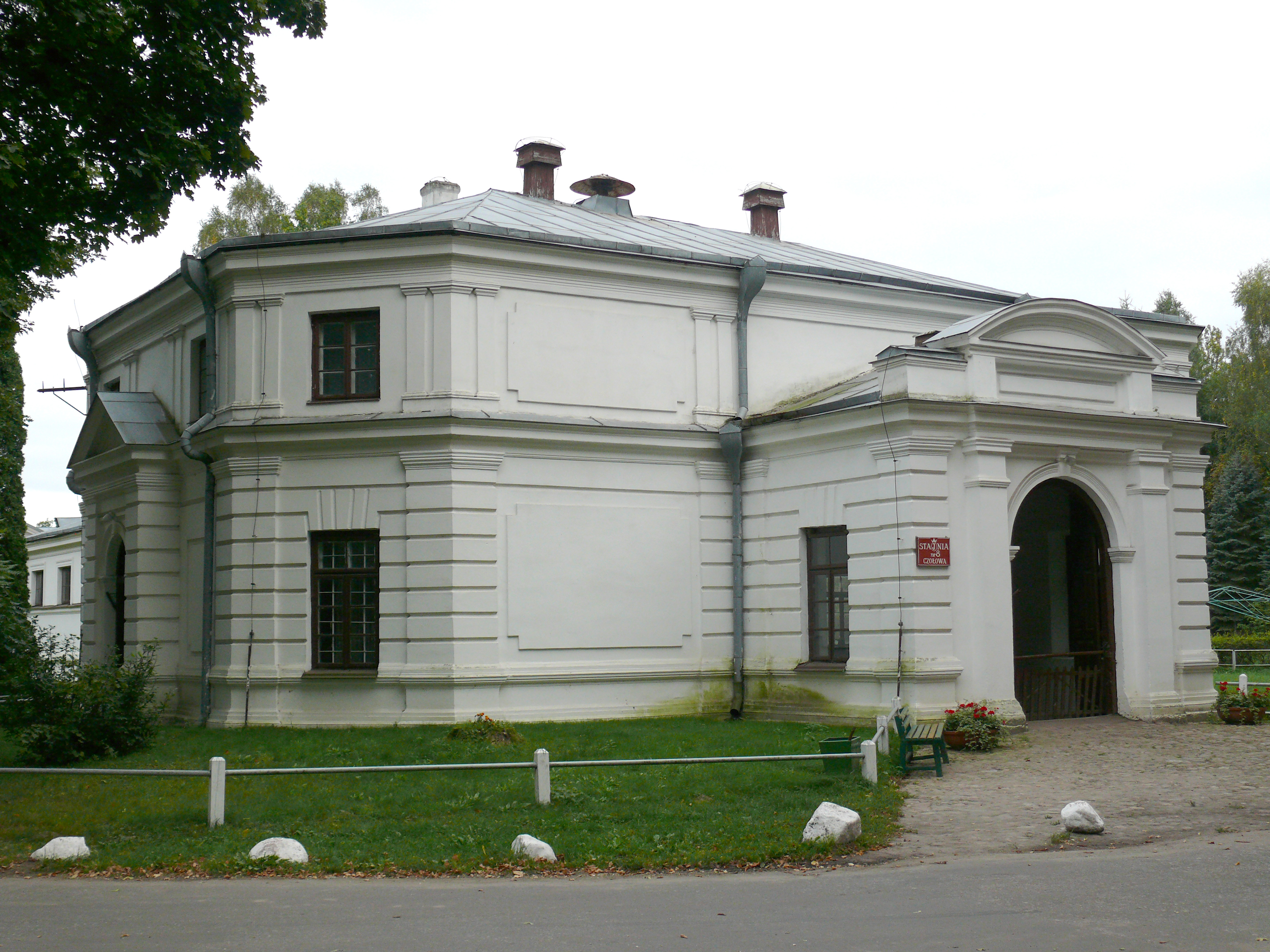
Front stables c. 1885

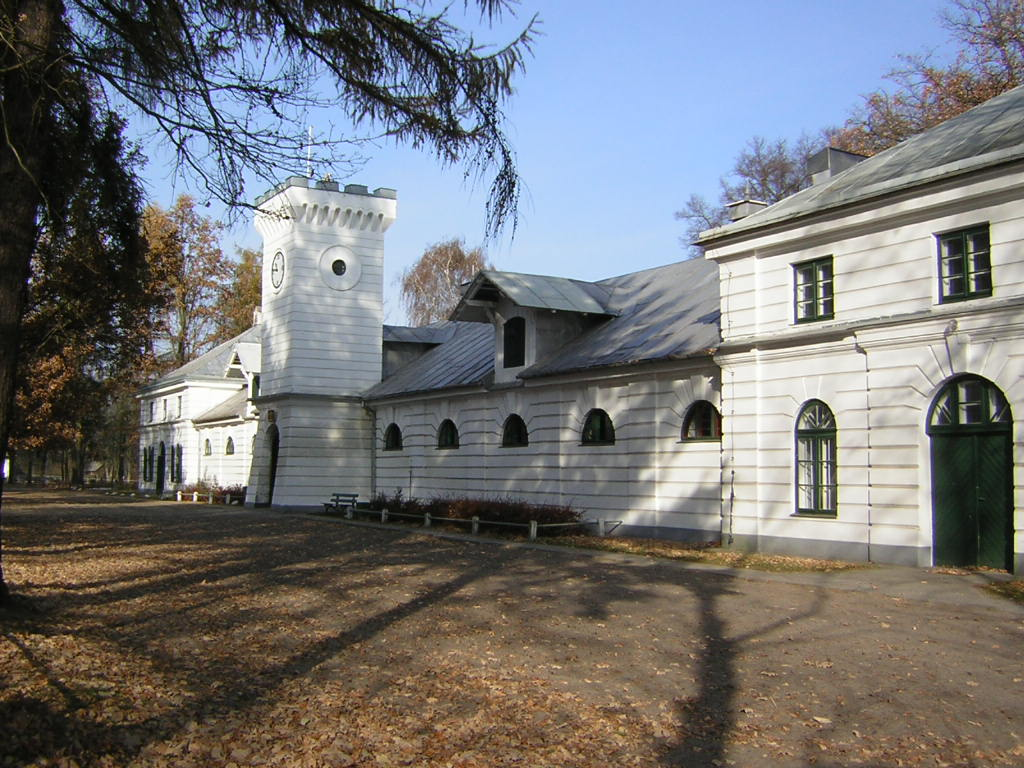
Clock Stables c. 1848

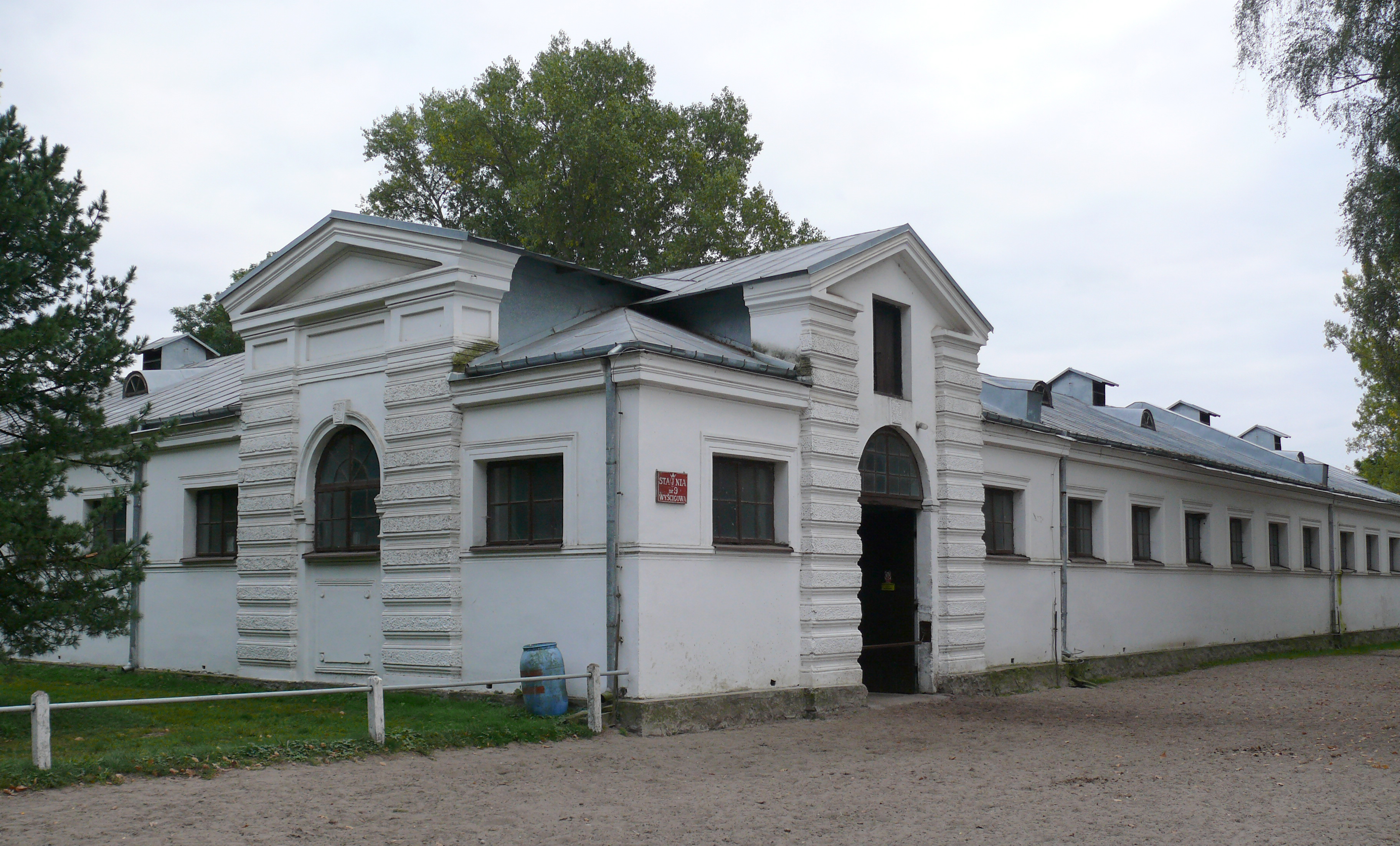
Racing stables c. 1887

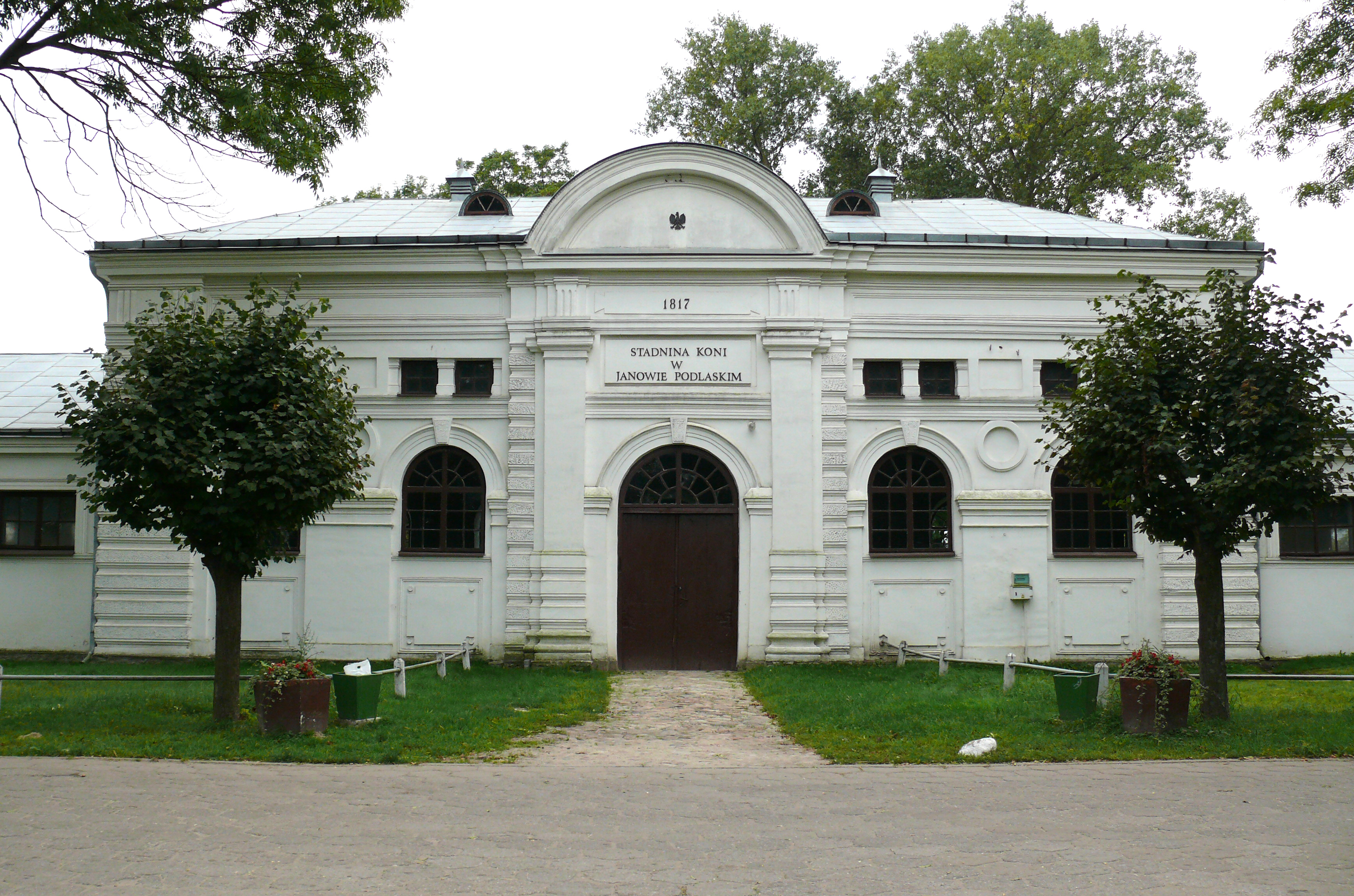
Riding hall

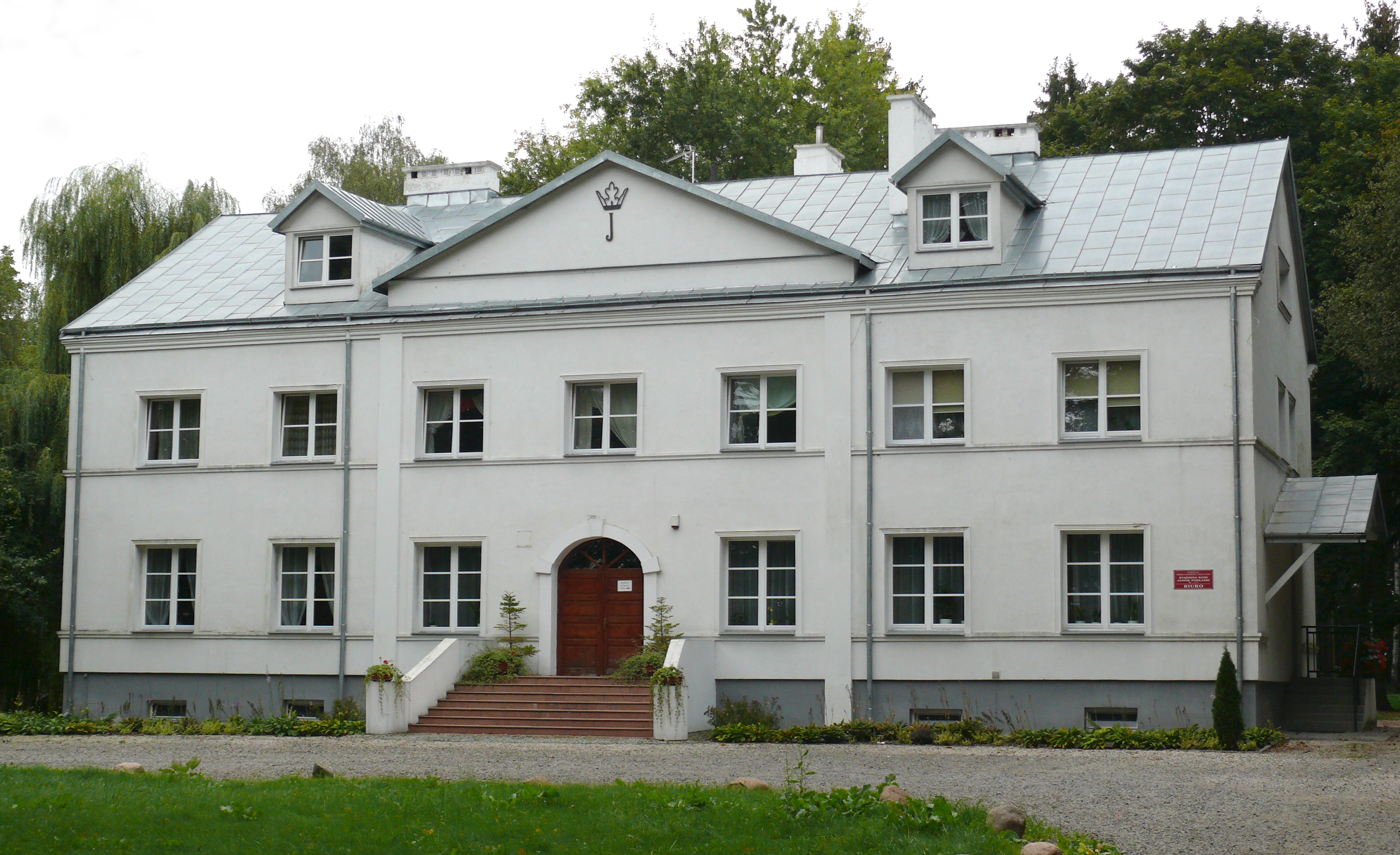
Stud farm office - previously a residential building

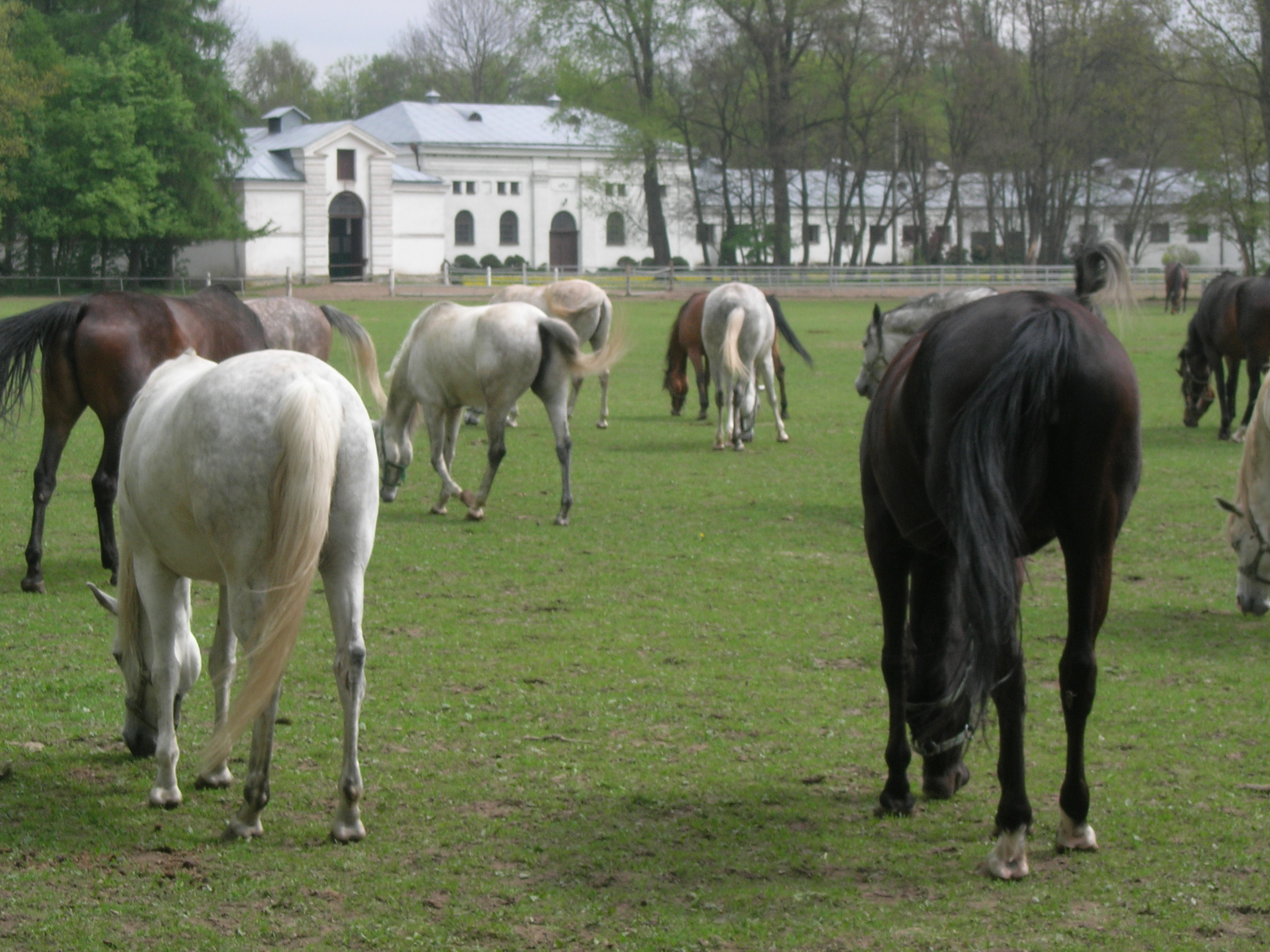
Mares in pasture

The history of the stud farm dates back to the Napoleonic Wars, as a result of which the number of horses on Polish lands decreased rapidly. Horses were too valuable for the army and the economy not to be noticed by those in power at that time. In order to regain the slowly losing position of horse power, at the request of the Administrative Council of the Kingdom of Poland, by decree of Emperor Alexander I in 1817, a government herd of horses was established, which became the beginning of the stud farm. The decision to locate the state herd there was determined by the existence of the large Wygoda farm near Janów and a large former Austrian stud farm.

The organizer and first manager of the Janów stud farm in the years 1816–1826 was Jan Ritz, a veterinarian. He created the foundations for future breeding by obtaining, with the permission of Alexander I, breeding stock from imperial stud farms and purchasing horses from private Russian and English breeders. In December 1817, he imported 54 stallions (25 English, 9 Arabian, 4 Danish, 2 Mecklenburg, 2 Caucasian and Italian), 100 mares and 33 foals. His main assistant as herd overseer was a former French officer, Jan Gosselin, who stayed in Poland after 1812 and started a family there. His daughter was one of the enthusiasts, Emilia Gosselin.

In the 19th century, the Janów stud farm became a major equine center in central Poland. With the help of the Russian governor of the Kingdom of Poland, Ivan Paskevich, a horse lover, the stud experienced a golden age. In 1841, according to the plans of the architect Enrico Marconi, the first brick stable was built, and in 1848 the second stable was constructed with a neo-Gothic clock tower. The clock was purchased for the then enormous sum of 363 rubles (2,400 Polish złotys. In addition to the government herd of horses, there was also a veterinary school and a practical riding and dressage school (since 1824). The herd's management included, among others: cups and medals and other decorations of horses purchased in Europe (e.g. silver cups of the mare Armida, winner of multiple races held in Warsaw), numerous paintings on horse themes, and an equine library with a number of Polish and German magazines. During this period, specialist and court counselor Filip Eberhardt managed the stud farm until the end of the 1870s as the overseer of the government herd. From July 1861, the titular function of the herd director was held by the actual councilor of state, equerry of the imperial court, Janusz Rostworowski (1811–1891).

In 1885, the Russian Count Alexander Nierodka built a brick stable with 85 stalls. He also brought a number of valuable horses from Western Europe, including Thoroughbreds and Arabian horses. It was then that the first Arabians appeared in Janów. In 1887, the count designated one of the stables specifically for racing horses. At the turn of the 19th and 20th centuries, Janów Podlaski was the most important center of breeding and equine knowledge in the western part of the Russian Empire.

At the beginning of the 20th century, Janów had a characteristic Janów horse, as it was called in professional literature, "with a proper, strong build and a firm and resistant constitution." Two breeding lines were developed but all achievements were lost with World War I. In February 1914, the herd was taken east where almost all died. The idea of recreating the stud farm in Janów from scratch was considered in 1918 by a group of Polish enthusiasts and equestrians. In April 1919, pure-bred Arabian mares were brought to the decimated Janów stables. Already by the 1920s foreign stud farms (e.g. Czech and German) were again buying horses from Janów. In 1924, the Janów stud began to specialize in breeding pure-bred Arabian horses.

=== World War II ===
The period of prosperity was interrupted by the outbreak of the next war, during which approximately 80% of the horses from the stud disappeared. Initially, about 200 horses were evacuated to Volhynia. After the Soviet invasion of Poland on 17 September 1939, the horses were transported to Janów, but many horses went missing during this transport. The Red Army took over the stud farm, set fire to the buildings, stole the horses that had been evacuated, and took them deep into the USSR—a 1,000 mile trek—to Tersk Stud. Among them was the mare Mammon and the stallion Ofir who became the foundation stock of the Arabian horse farm at Tersk. By October 1939, the few remaining Arabians at Janów were plundered by local residents, with the consent of the Soviet occupiers.

Once the stud farm was occupied by Wehrmacht German troops, Gustav Rau, commissioner for horse breeding and stud farms in the General Government, appeared. It resulted in some famous breeding stallions, such as Witraż and Wielki Szlem, being returned to Janów, as well as other purebred horses. By 1940, a horse parade and a breeding review were held at the Janów stud farm. Hans Fellgiebel, the commandant of the stud farm, made sure that the horses and their grooms were doing well, considering wartime conditions. Scientific research was conducted at the stud farm under the supervision of Bernhard Grzimek on, among other things, the horse's instinct to return to the stable.

In July 1944, a herd of about 300 pure-bred Arabian horses was evacuated to Nazi Germany, where it suffered losses during the bombing of Dresden. Horses from other Polish stud farms were also delivered to Saxony, including Białka Horse Stud, the Stallion Herd in Bogusławice, the Haack estate in Dębice, and the Stud Farm in Kozienice.

=== Post war ===
The horses returned to Poland in November 1946 by sea. For many weeks, two ships transported horses between Lübeck in Germany and Gdynia in Poland. 80 mares and foals returned to Janów Podlaski on November 1, 1950, and the stallions scattered among other stud farms didn't find their way to Janów until 1960. The famous stallion Witez II did not return from Germany and was sent instead to the USA as war booty by American General George S. Patton.

== Leadership ==
The stud flourished at the end of the 1950s, when Andrzej Krzyształowicz (1915–1998), a man associated with the stud since December 1939, became its director. He was responsible for taking care of the horses exported by the Germans, and he also organized the first auction of Arabian horses in the fall of 1969. Since then, nearly 1,000 Arabians have been sold abroad, generating a lot of foreign exchange for the country. The greatest financial successes were the sale of the Janów stallion El Paso for USD 1 million in 1980, Bandos for USD 806,000 in 1982, and in 1985 the mare Pencylina for USD 1.5 million. In 2015, a price of EUR 1.4 million was obtained for the mare Pepita, and the sale at this auction amounted to EUR 4 million.

During 2000–2016, the president of the stud farm was Marek Trela, who had been associated with it since 1978. During this period, the stud farm enjoyed a high reputation worldwide, and Arabian horse breeders from all over the world came to its Pride of Poland auctions. In 2015, the stud farm achieved a record profit of PLN 3 million.

In February 2016, PiS government minister Marek Skomorowski, an activist of Sovereign Poland (PiS) with no connection to horse breeding, became the president. During his leadership, the stud's reputation declined. There was even a scandal related to the death of two mares at the stud belonging to Shirley Watts, wife of Charlie Watts. In June, professor Sławomir Pietrzak took over as a result of a competition announced by the Agricultural Property Agency, but lost his position in March 2018 to Grzegorz Czochański.

Czochański failed to rebuild the stud's position, and was also accused of offering the best mares at the Pride of Poland auction in 2019, impoverishing the stud's genetic lines. Between April and September 2020, the president was Marek Gawlik, who also had no experience in horse breeding.

The situation improved slightly during the presidency of Lucjan Cichosz, also a PiS politician, but with a specialized education. Over the next two years, the stud farm, which had been suffering millions of dollars in losses for several years, made a small profit. In March 2023, Hanna Sztuka was the president for a few days, and her successor was Marcin Oszczapiński.

=== Directors and managers ===
- Aleksander Potocki (1816/1817–1832)
- Jan Ritz (1816/1819–1826)
- Andrzej Krzyształowicz (1956–1991)
- Marek Trela (2000–2016)
- Marek Skomorowski (2016)
- Sławomir Pietrzak (2016–2018)
- Grzegorz Czochański (2018–2020)
- Marek Gawlik (2020)
- Lucjan Cichosz (2020–2023)
- Hanna Sztuka (in 2023)
- Marcin Oszczapiński (from 2023)

== See also ==
- Polish Arabian
- Michałów Stud Farm
