= Lytton (surname) =

Lytton is a surname. Notable people with the surname include:

- Antony Bulwer-Lytton, Viscount Knebworth (1903–1933), British pilot and politician
- Lady Constance Bulwer-Lytton (1869–1923), British suffragette activist, writer, speaker and campaigner
- David Lytton Cobbold, 2nd Baron Cobbold (1937–2022), English banker and country house manager
- Edward Bulwer-Lytton, 1st Baron Lytton (1803–1873), English novelist, poet, playwright, and politician
- Elizabeth Barbara Lytton (1773–1843), foremother of the Bulwer-Lytton family
- Sir Henry Lytton (1865–1936), English actor and singer
- Henry Lytton Cobbold, 3rd Baron Cobbold (born 1962), English screenwriter and country house manager
- Hugh Lytton (1921–2002), Canadian psychologist
- John Lytton, 5th Earl of Lytton (born 1950), British surveyor and House of Lords member
- Judith Blunt-Lytton, 16th Baroness Wentworth (1873–1957), British peer, Arabian horse breeder and real tennis player
- Louisa Lytton (born 1989), English actress
- Neville Bulwer-Lytton, 3rd Earl of Lytton (1879–1951), British military officer and artist
- Noel Lytton, 4th Earl of Lytton (1900–1985), British Army officer and writer
- Paul Lytton (born 1947), English jazz percussionist
- Philip Lytton, pseudonym of Charles Ernest Phillips (died 1949), Australian actor and theatrical entrepreneur
- Robert Bulwer-Lytton, 1st Earl of Lytton (1831–1891), English statesman and poet, Viceroy of India during the Great Famine of 1876–78
- Rogers Lytton (1867–1924), American film actor
- Sir Roland Lytton (or Rowland Litton, 1561–1615), English lawyer and politician
- Sir Rowland Lytton (c.1615–1674), English politician
- Rosina Bulwer Lytton (1802–1882), English novelist and essayist
- Victor Bulwer-Lytton, 2nd Earl of Lytton (1876–1947), British politician and colonial administrator
- Sir William Lytton (1586–1660), English politician

Fictional characters:

- Vanessa Lytton in BBC medical drama series Holby City

== See also ==
- Litton (surname)
