= Lytton =

Lytton may refer to:

== Places ==
=== Australia ===
- Lytton, Queensland
  - Lytton Reach, a reach of the Brisbane River
  - Electoral district of Lytton, Queensland

=== Canada ===
- Lytton, British Columbia, named for Edward Bulwer-Lytton
  - Lytton Mountain, named for the town of Lytton
- Lytton Township, since 2001 part of Montcerf-Lytton, Quebec

=== United States of America ===
- Lytton, California
- Lytton, Iowa
- Lytton, Ohio
- Lytton, West Virginia

=== Fictional ===
- Lytton, California, a city in Police Quest computer game series

== People ==
A number of important people have held the name Lytton, both as a surname and as a first name, as in Lytton Strachey.

- Lytton (surname)
- Lytton Strachey
- Earl of Lytton (being Edward Bulwer-Lytton and his progeny agnatic, a family named Lytton)

== Other uses ==
- Lytton First Nation, aka the Lytton Band, a band government of the Nlaka'pamux people, centred at Lytton, British Columbia
- Lytton High School, a co-educational secondary school in Gisborne, New Zealand
- Lytton Statistical Area, part of the Gisborne suburb of Riverdale, New Zealand
- Lytton (sternwheeler), a lake steamer in British Columbia, Canada
- Henry C. Lytton & Co., popularly called "Lytton's", a department store chain

== See also ==
- Litton (disambiguation)
