= Earl of Lytton =

Earldom in the Peerage of the United Kingdom

Earldom of Lytton
- Quarterly: 1st and 4th, Ermine on a chief dancettée azure two ducal coronets or a canton argent charged with a rose gules barbed and seeded proper (Lytton); 2nd and 3rd, gules on a chevron argent between three eagles regardant or, as many cinquefoils sable (Bulwer)
- Creation date: 28 April 1880
- Created by: Queen Victoria
- Peerage: United Kingdom
- First holder: Robert Bulwer-Lytton, 2nd Baron Lytton
- Present holder: John Lytton, 5th Earl of Lytton
- Heir apparent: Philip Lytton, Viscount Knebworth
- Remainder to: 1st Earl's heirs male lawfully begotten
- Subsidiary titles: Viscount Knebworth; Baron Wentworth; Baron Lytton; Baronet (of Knebworth)
- Seat: Newbuildings Place
- Former seat: Knebworth House
- Motto: Hoc Virtutis Opus ("This is the work of virtue")

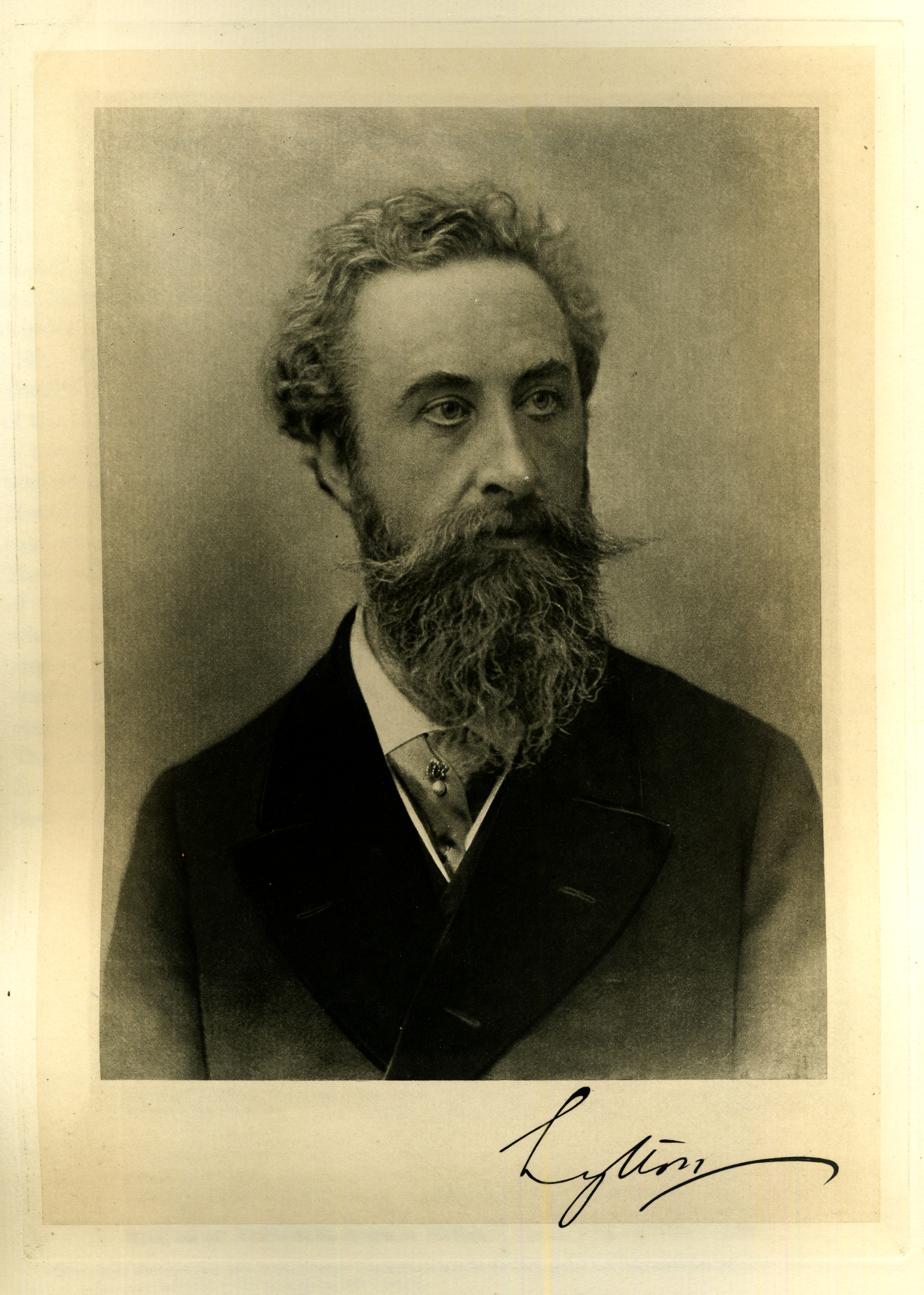
Robert Bulwer-Lytton, 1st Earl of Lytton

Earl of Lytton, in the County of Derby, is a title in the Peerage of the United Kingdom. It was created in 1880 for the diplomat and poet Robert Bulwer-Lytton, 2nd Baron Lytton. He was Viceroy of India from 1876 to 1880 and British Ambassador to France from 1887 to 1891. He was made Viscount Knebworth, of Knebworth in the County of Hertford, at the same time he was given the earldom, also in the Peerage of the United Kingdom.

== History ==
Robert Bulwer-Lytton was the son of the poet, novelist and politician Edward Bulwer-Lytton, 1st Baron Lytton, and his wife, the novelist Rosina Doyle Wheeler. Edward was the author of numerous popular novels, poems and dramas and also served as Secretary of State for the Colonies under the Earl of Derby between 1858 and 1859. Born Edward Bulwer, he was the third and youngest son of General William Earle Bulwer and his wife Elizabeth Barbara Lytton, daughter of Richard Warburton Lytton of Knebworth House, Hertfordshire (through which marriage the Knebworth estate came into the Bulwer family). He was created a baronet, of Knebworth House in the County of Hertford, in the Baronetage of the United Kingdom, in 1838, and in 1866, he was raised to the Peerage of the United Kingdom as Baron Lytton, of Knebworth in the County of Hertford. In 1844, he also assumed by Royal licence the additional surname and arms of Lytton.

The first Earl of Lytton was succeeded by his son, the second Earl. He was also a politician and served as Under-Secretary of State for India from 1920 to 1922 and as Governor of Bengal from 1922 to 1927. Lord Lytton married Pamela Plowden, remembered as the first great love of Winston Churchill. Their two sons, Antony Bulwer-Lytton, Viscount Knebworth, and Alexander Bulwer-Lytton, Viscount Knebworth, both predeceased them, Antony killed in a plane crash in 1933 and Alexander killed in action in World War II. Their daughter, Lady Hermione Lytton, married Cameron Cobbold, 1st Baron Cobbold, and through this marriage Knebworth House passed to the Cobbold family (see the Baron Cobbold).

Lord Lytton was succeeded by his younger brother, the third Earl. He was a portrait and landscape painter. In 1899 he married Judith Blunt, 16th Baroness Wentworth, the renowned horse breeder who devoted her life to the Crabbet Arabian Stud. The stud had been created by her parents, the poet Wilfrid Scawen Blunt and his wife Anne Blunt, 15th Baroness Wentworth, granddaughter of Lord Byron through his daughter Ada Lovelace (see the Baron Wentworth for earlier history of this title). They were divorced in 1923.

Lord Lytton and Lady Wentworth were succeeded, respectively, in 1951 and 1957 by their son Noel Lytton, 4th Earl of Lytton; as a consequence the title Baron Wentworth, in the Peerage of England, became subsidiary to the earldom of Lytton. He assumed by deed poll the additional surname of Milbanke in 1925, but discontinued by deed poll the use of this surname in 1951. As of 2017 the titles are held by his eldest son, the fifth Earl, who succeeded in 1985.

Another member of the family was the Liberal politician, diplomat and writer Henry Bulwer, 1st Baron Dalling and Bulwer. He was the elder brother of the first Baron Lytton.

The family seat is Newbuildings Place, near Shipley, West Sussex.

== Lytton baronets, of Knebworth House (1838) ==
- Edward Bulwer-Lytton, 1st Baronet (1803–1873) (created Baron Lytton in 1866)

=== Baron Lytton (1866) ===
- Edward Bulwer-Lytton, 1st Baron Lytton (1803–1873)
- (Edward) Robert Lytton Bulwer-Lytton, 2nd Baron Lytton (1831–1891) (created Earl of Lytton in 1880)

=== Earl of Lytton (1880) ===
- (Edward) Robert Lytton Bulwer-Lytton, 1st Earl of Lytton (1831–1891)
  - Edward Roland John Bulwer-Lytton (1865–1871)
  - Hon. Henry Meredith Edward Bulwer-Lytton (1872–1874)
- Victor Alexander George Robert Bulwer-Lytton, 2nd Earl of Lytton (1876–1947)
  - (Edward) Antony James Bulwer-Lytton, Viscount Knebworth (1903–1933)
  - Alexander Edward John Bulwer-Lytton, Viscount Knebworth (1910–1942)
- Neville Stephen Bulwer-Lytton, 3rd Earl of Lytton (1879–1951)
- Noel Anthony Scawen Lytton, 4th Earl of Lytton (1900–1985)
- John Peter Michael Scawen Lytton, 5th Earl of Lytton (born 1950)

The heir apparent is the present holder's son, Philip Anthony Scawen Lytton, Viscount Knebworth (born 1989)

== Title succession chart ==
Title succession chart, Lytton baronets, Barons Lytton and Earls of Lytton

Edward Bulwer-Lytton; 1st Baron Lytton; 1st Baronet; 1803–1873
Earl of Lytton
Robert Bulwer-Lytton; 1st Earl of Lytton; 2nd Baron Lytton; 1831–1891
Edward Bulwer-Lytton; 1865–1871	Hon. Henry Bulwer-Lytton; 1872–1874	Victor Bulwer-Lytton; 2nd Earl of Lytton; 1876–1947	Neville Bulwer-Lytton; 3rd Earl of Lytton; 1879–1951
Antony Bulwer-Lytton; Viscount Knebworth; 1903–1933	Alexander Bulwer-Lytton; Viscount Knebworth; 1910–1942	Noel Lytton; 4th Earl of Lytton; 17th Baron Wentworth; 1900–1985
John Lytton; 5th Earl of Lytton; 18th Baron Wentworth born 1950
Philip Lytton; Viscount Knebworth born 1989

== Line of succession ==
Line of succession
- (Edward) Robert Lytton Bulwer-Lytton, 1st Earl of Lytton (1831–1891)
  - Hon. Henry Bulwer-Lytton (1872–1874)
  - Victor Alexander George Robert Bulwer-Lytton, 2nd Earl of Lytton (1876–1947)
    - (Edward) Antony James Bulwer-Lytton, Viscount Knebworth (1903–1933)
    - Alexander Edward John Bulwer-Lytton, Viscount Knebworth (1910–1942)
  - Neville Stephen Bulwer-Lytton, 3rd Earl of Lytton (1879–1951)
    - Noel Anthony Scawen Lytton, 4th Earl of Lytton (1900–1985)
      - John Peter Michael Scawen Lytton, 5th Earl of Lytton (born 1950)
        - (1) Philip Anthony Scawen Lytton, Viscount Knebworth (born 1989)
        - (2) Hon. Wilfrid Thomas Scawan Lytton (born 1992)
      - (3) Hon. (Thomas) Roland Cyril Lawrence Lytton (born 1954)

== See also ==
- Baron Wentworth

Baronetage of the United Kingdom
Preceded by Herschel baronets	Lytton baronets of Knebworth House; July 1838	Succeeded by Smith baronets
