= John Lytton, 5th Earl of Lytton =

British chartered surveyor and hereditary peer

The Right Honourable The Earl of Lytton DL FRICS
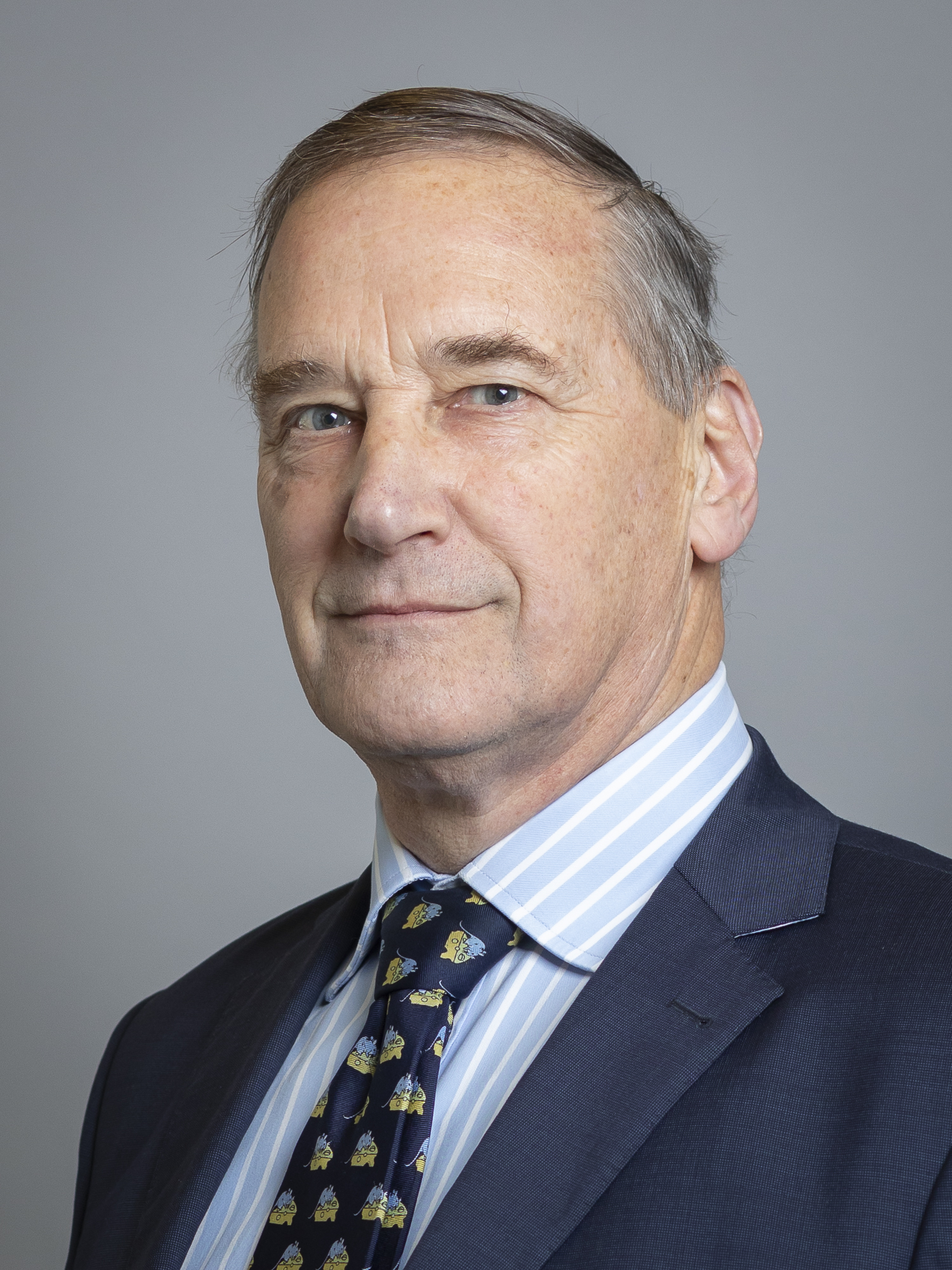
- Official portrait, 2020

Member of the House of Lords
- Lord Temporal
- Hereditary peerage 23 April 1985 – 11 November 1999
- Preceded by: The 4th Earl of Lytton
- Succeeded by: Seat abolished
- Elected Hereditary Peer; 16 May 2011 – 28 March 2026
- By-election: 2011
- Preceded by: The 11th Baron Monson
- Succeeded by: Seat abolished

Personal details
- Born: John Peter Michael Scawen Lytton; 7 June 1950 (age 76)
- Party: None (crossbencher)
- Spouse: Ursula Alexandra Komoly (m. 1980)
- Relations: Baron Cobbold
- Children: 3
- Parent: Noel Lytton, 4th Earl of Lytton (father)
- Education: Downside School
- Alma mater: University of Reading
- Occupation: Chartered surveyor, peer, politician
- Other titles: 18th Baron Wentworth; 6th Baron Lytton; 6th Baronet (of Knebworth)

John Peter Michael Scawen Lytton, 5th Earl of Lytton (born 7 June 1950), styled Viscount Knebworth from 1951 to 1985, is a British chartered surveyor, hereditary peer and member of the House of Lords.

== Background and education ==
The elder son of Noel Lytton, 4th Earl of Lytton, by his wife Clarissa Mary née Palmer, he is a descendant of the poet and adventurer Lord Byron (born 1788) via his daughter Ada Lovelace (born 1815), who was arguably the world's first computer programmer. Her daughter Anne (born 1837) married the poet Wilfrid Scawen Blunt; their daughter Judith Blunt-Lytton was the grandmother of the 4th Earl and thus the great-grandmother of the 5th and present earl. He is also patrilineally descended from Edward Bulwer-Lytton.

Educated at Downside School, Lytton read estate management at the University of Reading, graduating as BSc in 1972.

== Career ==
After spending thirteen years at the Inland Revenue Valuation Office and some additional years with surveying firms Permutt Brown & Co. and Cubitt & West, he set up the practice of John Lytton & Co., Chartered Surveyors, in January 1988. Succeeding his father in the earldom in 1985, he was deprived of a seat in the House of Lords upon the passing of the House of Lords Act 1999. However, on 11 May 2011 Lord Lytton won a hereditary peer by-election being reintroduced to the Lords, where he sits as a crossbencher.

Lord Lytton has taken his Byronic ancestry to heart and contributes to the Newstead Byron Society Review, as well as speaking before the Byron Society about his family history. He was elected President of the Newstead Abbey Byron Society in 1988.

Elected a Fellow of the Royal Institution of Chartered Surveyors (FRICS) in 1987 and Hon. FBEng in 1997, Lord Lytton is a Patron of the Chartered Association of Building Engineers. Since 2011, he serves as a Deputy Lieutenant for West Sussex.

== Family ==
He married, on 7 June 1980, Ursula Alexandra Komoly, a daughter of Anton Komoly of Vienna, Austria; the Earl and Countess of Lytton have three children:

- Lady Katrina Mary Noel Lytton (born 1985)
- Philip Anthony Scawen Lytton, Viscount Knebworth (born 1989)
- Hon. Wilfrid Thomas Scawen Lytton (born 1992).

Lord Lytton inherited Newbuildings Place in West Sussex in 1984 from his aunt, Lady Anne Lytton. His cousins on the Cobbold side maintain the ancestral estate, Knebworth House, in Hertfordshire.

== See also ==
- Earl of Lytton
- Baron Wentworth

== Notes ==
Peerage of the United Kingdom
Preceded by Noel Lytton	Earl of Lytton; 1985–present Member of the House of Lords (1985–1999)	Incumbent; Heir apparent: Philip Lytton, Viscount Knebworth
Preceded by Noel Lytton	Baron Lytton; 1985–present	Incumbent; Heir apparent: Philip Lytton, Viscount Knebworth
Peerage of England
Preceded by Noel Lytton	Baron Wentworth; 1985–present	Incumbent; Heir apparent: Philip Lytton, Viscount Knebworth
Baronetage of the United Kingdom
Preceded by Noel Lytton	Baronet of Knebworth; 1985–present	Incumbent; Heir apparent: Philip Lytton, Viscount Knebworth
Parliament of the United Kingdom
Preceded by The Lord Monson	Elected hereditary peer to the House of Lords under the House of Lords Act 1999; 2011–present 2026	Office abolished under the House of Lords (Hereditary Peers) Act 2026
