= Baroness Cobbold =

Baroness Cobbold may refer to:

- Hermione Cobbold, Baroness Cobbold (1905–2004), British matriarch
- Chryssie Lytton Cobbold, Baroness Cobbold (1940–2024), British aristocrat and writer
