= Chryssie Lytton Cobbold, Baroness Cobbold =

British aristocrat and writer (1940–2024)

Christine Elizabeth Lytton Cobbold, Baroness Cobbold (née Stucley; 25 April 1940 – 7 April 2024), was a British aristocrat and writer. She was married to David Lytton Cobbold, 2nd Baron Cobbold; together they organised the Knebworth Festival at Knebworth House.

== Early life ==
Christine Elizabeth "Chryssie" Stucley was born on 25 April 1940 to Sir Dennis Frederic Bankes Stucley, 5th Baronet, and Sheila Margaret Warwick Bampfylde (1912–1996), daughter of George Wentworth Warwick Bampfylde, 4th Baron Poltimore. She was raised at Affeton Castle and Hartland Abbey. She and her four siblings grew up frequently hunting on Exmoor. She was educated at Southover Manor School.

After school, she worked as a pattern cutter for the House of Worth. In 1958, she became one of the last debutantes to be presented to Queen Elizabeth II. During her first season, she met David Cobbold at his 21st birthday party at Knebworth House.

== Marriage and family ==
She and Cobbold were married on 7 January 1961 at St Nectan's Church near Hartland Abbey. On 10 January 1961, he changed his family name by deed poll to "Lytton Cobbold" to recognize his mother's ancestry. He succeeded his father as 2nd Baron Cobbold in 1987.

They had four children:

- Henry Lytton Cobbold, 3rd Baron Cobbold
- Peter Lytton Cobbold
- Richard Lytton Cobbold
- Rosina Lytton Cobbold

In the 1980s, the couple also informally adopted two Ugandan teenagers, friends of their eldest son from Eton College.

== Knebworth Festival ==
In the 1960s the Lytton Cobbolds undertook an extensive renovation of Knebworth House. They opened it to the public in 1971. The title of her best-selling 1986 memoir, Board Meetings in the Bath: How We Opened Knebworth House to the Public, was inspired by the bathtub she had installed in the kitchen of their Little Venice home.

In 1974, they instituted the Knebworth Festival, a summer rock festival, at Knebworth. The first was headlined by Van Morrison and The Allman Brothers Band. In August 1986, Knebworth hosted Freddie Mercury's last live performances with Queen.

== Death ==
Lady Cobbold died of pancreatic cancer on 7 April 2024, at the age of 83. She was buried in the gardens of Knebworth House beside her husband, who had died in 2022.

== Publications ==
- Lytton Cobbold, Chryssie (1986). Board Meetings in the Bath: How We Opened Knebworth House to the Public. London: Methuen. ISBN 9780413416506.
