= Litton =

Litton may refer to:

== Places ==
- Litton, Derbyshire, England
- Litton, North Yorkshire, England
- Litton, Somerset, England
- Litton, Mississippi, United States, an unincorporated community

== Other uses ==
- Litton (surname)
- Litton Entertainment, an American television program producer
- Litton Industries, a defunct conglomerate
- Litton, an appliance brand owned by Maytag, acquired from the defunct Litton Industries

== See also ==
- Lytton (disambiguation)
