= Victor Bulwer-Lytton, 2nd Earl of Lytton =

British politician and colonial administrator

The Right Honourable The Earl of Lytton KG GCSI GCIE GCStJ PC DL
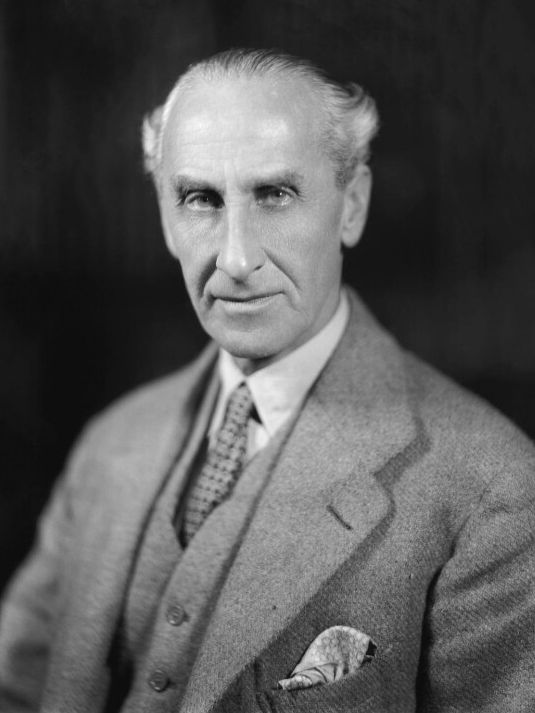
- The Earl of Lytton, c. 1936

Member of the House of Lords
- Lord Temporal
- In office 24 November 1891 – 25 October 1947
- Preceded by: The 1st Earl of Lytton
- Succeeded by: The 3rd Earl of Lytton

Governor of Bengal
- In office 1922–1927
- Monarch: George V
- Preceded by: Earl of Ronaldshay
- Succeeded by: Sir Stanley Jackson

Personal details
- Born: 9 August 1876 Simla, British India
- Died: 25 October 1947 (aged 71)
- Spouse: Pamela Frances Audrey Chichele-Plowden (m. 1902)
- Children: 4
- Parent(s): Robert Bulwer-Lytton, 1st Earl of Lytton; Edith Villiers
- Relatives: The 2nd Baron Cobbold (grandson); The 6th Earl Erne (grandson); The 6th Baron Terrington (grandson); The 3rd Earl of Lytton (brother)
- Education: Eton College
- Alma mater: Trinity College, Cambridge

Victor Alexander George Robert Bulwer-Lytton, 2nd Earl of Lytton (9 August 1876 – 25 October 1947), styled Viscount Knebworth from 1880 to 1891, was a British politician and colonial administrator. He served as Governor of Bengal between 1922 and 1927 and was briefly Acting Viceroy of India in 1926. He headed the Lytton Commission for the League of Nations in 1931–1932, producing the Lytton Report which condemned the Japanese invasion of Manchuria and denounced Manchukuo as a Japanese puppet state.

== Early life ==
He was born in Simla in British India on 9 August 1876, during the time when his father was Viceroy of India. Lytton was the fourth, but eldest surviving, son of the 2nd Baron Lytton (later created, in 1880, the 1st Earl of Lytton) and Edith Villiers, daughter of Edward Ernest Villiers and granddaughter of George Villiers. His six siblings were Edward Rowland John Bulwer-Lytton (who died young), Elizabeth Edith Bulwer-Lytton (wife of the 2nd Earl of Balfour, the brother of the future Prime Minister Arthur Balfour), Constance Bulwer-Lytton (a prominent suffragette), Henry Meredith Edward Bulwer-Lytton (who died young), Emily Bulwer-Lytton (who married architect Edwin Lutyens), and Neville Bulwer-Lytton, 3rd Earl of Lytton. He was the grandson of the English novelist, writer, and politician Edward Bulwer-Lytton.

He was educated at Eton and Trinity College, Cambridge, where he was secretary of the University Pitt Club. In 1905 he was President of the Edinburgh Sir Walter Scott Club and gave the Toast to Sir Walter at the club's annual dinner.

== Career ==
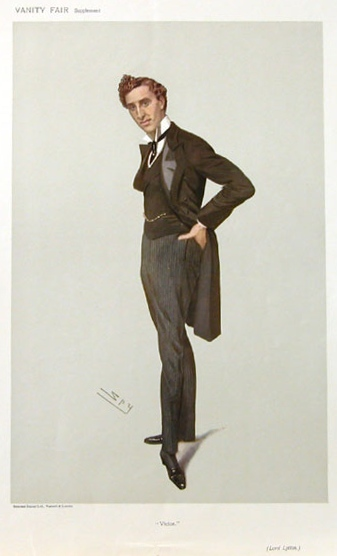
Lytton caricatured by "Spy" for Vanity Fair, 1906

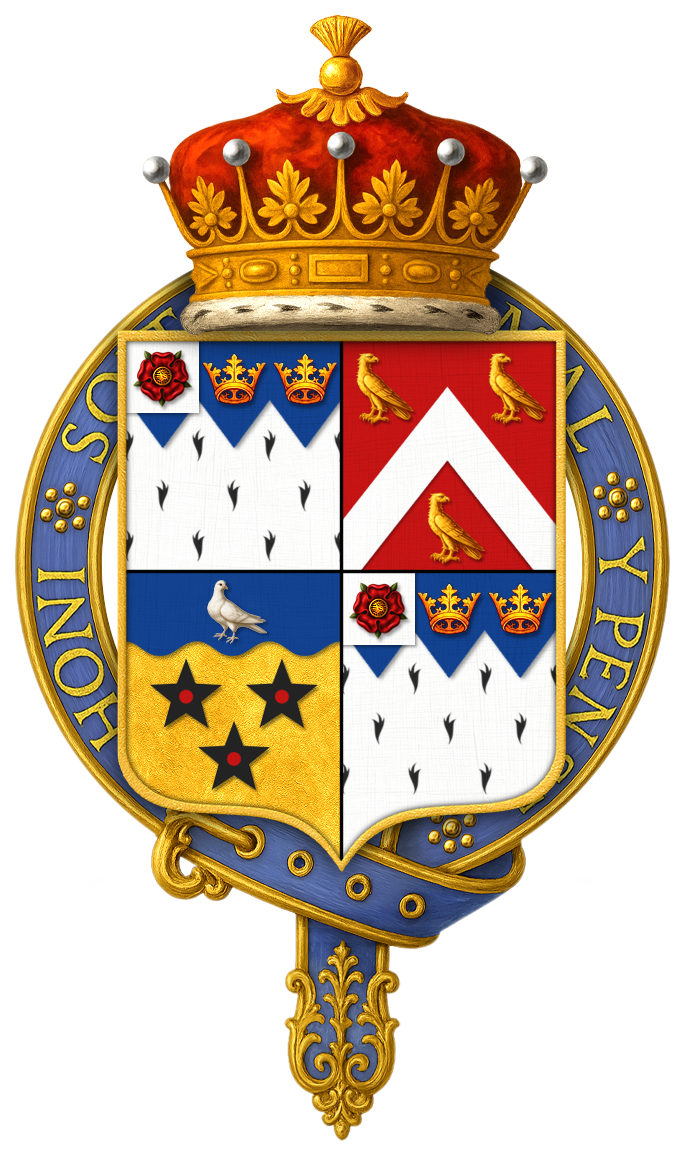
Garter-encircled shield of arms of Victor Bulwer-Lytton, 2nd Earl of Lytton, KG, as displayed on his Order of the Garter stall plate in St. George's Chapel.

Lytton took his seat in the House of Lords as a Conservative in January 1902, where he was an advocate for female suffrage, being influenced by his sister, the suffragette, Lady Constance Bulwer-Lytton. He chaired the all-party 'Conciliation Committee' that drafted the Parliamentary Franchise (Women) Bill, known as the Conciliation Bill, in 1910. The wartime coalition gave Lytton the chance to hold government office, and he started his official career by filling various posts in the Admiralty between 1916 and 1920, before being appointed Under-Secretary of State for India, a post which he held between 1920 and 1922. He was made a Privy Counsellor in 1919. On 16 February 1922 he was posted as Governor of Bengal, remaining there until 3 March 1927.

For a short while, when there was a vacancy caused by change in incumbents in 1926, he functioned as Viceroy, his father's old post. After this he filled miscellaneous positions in various capacities when matters concerning India arose. He wrote two books, the first being a biography of his grandfather Lord Lytton, while the other book dealt with his experiences in India and was called Pundits and Elephants, published in 1942. He was made a Knight Companion of the Garter in 1933.

He was chairman of London Associated Electricity Undertakings Limited from 1937 to 1947.

Lytton is best known for his chairmanship of the Lytton Commission, which was sent by the League of Nations on a fact-finding mission to determine who was to blame in the 1931 war between Japan and China. The commission's Lytton Report, officially issued on 1 October 1932, blames Japanese aggression. In response Japan withdrew from the League of Nations.

== Personal life ==
On 3 April 1902, Lord Lytton married Pamela Frances Audrey Chichele-Plowden (1874–1971) at St Margaret's, Westminster. Pamela was a daughter of Sir Trevor Chichele Plowden and Millicent Frances Foster (eldest daughter of Gen. Sir Charles John Foster). Her elder brother was Alfred Chichele Plowden. She had been an early flame of Winston Churchill, but that relationship was amicably broken off when she decided to marry Lytton instead. Together, the couple were the parents of two sons, both of whom predeceased Lytton, and two daughters:

- Antony Bulwer-Lytton, Viscount Knebworth (1903–1933), an MP for Hitchin who died aged 30 in an air crash while serving with the Auxiliary Air Force.
- Lady Margaret Hermione Millicent Bulwer-Lytton (1905–2004), who married Cameron Cobbold, who became a Governor of the Bank of England, Lord Chamberlain and Baron Cobbold in 1960.
- Lady Davidema Katharine Cynthia Mary Millicent Bulwer-Lytton (1909–1995), who married John Crichton, 5th Earl Erne, in 1931. After his death, she married Montague Woodhouse, 5th Baron Terrington, in 1945.
- Alexander Edward John Bulwer-Lytton, Viscount Knebworth, MBE (1910–1942), who was killed in the Second Battle of El Alamein during World War II.

Lord Lytton died in October 1947, aged 71. As neither of his sons had left a son, Lytton's titles were inherited upon his death by his younger brother Neville Bulwer-Lytton. Knebworth House passed to his daughter Lady Hermione Cobbold (and so his son-in-law became later Baron Cobbold of Knebworth). She was interviewed about her father by the historian Brian Harrison, as part of the Suffrage Interviews project, titled Oral evidence on the suffragette and suffragist movements: the Brian Harrison interviews. She talks about her father's childhood; his love of skating, mountaineering and skiing; the family's move to India; his interest in health and his experience with depression. His second daughter, Davina, was also interviewed as part of the project and outlines his support for the suffrage movement.

== Honours ==
Lord Lytton was appointed a Knight Grand Commander of the Order of the Indian Empire (GCIE) in 1922, a Knight Grand Commander of the Order of the Star of India (GCSI) in the 1925 Birthday Honours, and a Knight of the Garter (KG) in the 1933 Birthday Honours.

Political offices
Preceded by The Lord Sinha	Under-Secretary of State for India; 1920–1922	Succeeded by The Earl Winterton
Government offices
Preceded by Earl of Ronaldshay	Governor of Bengal; 1922–1927	Succeeded by Sir Stanley Jackson
Preceded by The Earl of Reading	Viceroy of India; 1925	Succeeded by The Lord Irwin
Peerage of the United Kingdom
Preceded by Robert Bulwer-Lytton	Earl of Lytton; 1891–1947; Member of the House of Lords (1891–1947)	Succeeded by Neville Bulwer-Lytton
Preceded by Robert Bulwer-Lytton	Baron Lytton; 1891–1947	Succeeded by Neville Bulwer-Lytton
Baronetage of the United Kingdom
Preceded by Robert Bulwer-Lytton	Baronet of Knebworth House; 1891–1947	Succeeded by Neville Bulwer-Lytton
