= Chartered Association of Building Engineers =

UK-based professional body

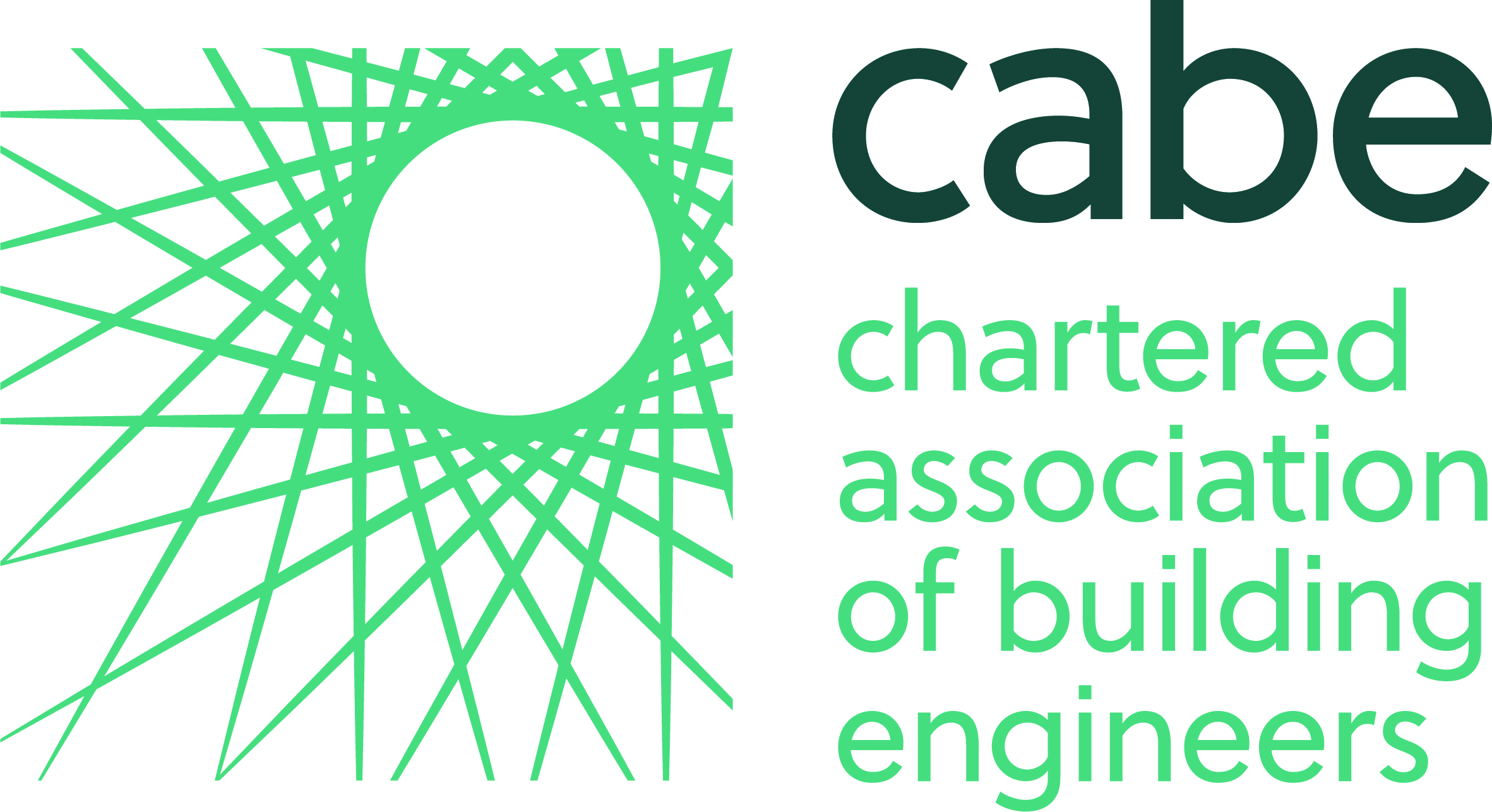
- Official logo of the Chartered Association of Building Engineers
- Abbreviation: CABE
- Formation: 1925; 101 years ago
- Type: Professional body
- Purpose: Enabling a professional construction sector that works to create better, safer and more sustainable buildings that enhance people's lives.
- Headquarters: Northampton, England, UK
- Coordinates: 52°15′32″N 0°50′11″W
- Region served: International
- Members: 9,000+ (2022)
- Official language: English
- Patron: John Lytton, 5th Earl of Lytton
- President: Paul Grinyer
- Chief Executive: Richard Harral
- Website: www.cbuilde.com
- Formerly called: Incorporated Association of Architects and Surveyors; The Association of Building Engineers

The Chartered Association of Building Engineers (CABE) is a professional body for building engineers in the United Kingdom and overseas. CABE was founded as the Incorporated Association of Architects and Surveyors (IAAS) in 1925 in London, and then received its Royal Charter in 2014 and the association renamed as the Chartered Association of Building Engineers. CABE is headquartered in Northampton, United Kingdom.

The association is the professional body for building engineering in the UK, with the ability to award the status of Chartered Building Engineer (C.Build E) under its Royal Charter, and through the Engineering Council the awards of Chartered Engineer (CEng). CABE is a full member of the Construction Industry Council.

== History ==
CABE originated as the Incorporated Association of Architects and Surveyors (IAAS) in London in 1925. This early incarnation reflected the association's initial focus on both architecture and surveying professions. In 1993, it rebranded itself as the Association of Building Engineers (ABE) to reflect a greater emphasis on building engineering as a distinct discipline. A significant milestone came in 2014, when the organization was granted a Royal Charter, formally becoming the Chartered Association of Building Engineers.

During its early years, the IAAS actively participated in debates about architectural registration laws in the UK. It notably opposed the 1927 draft Architects (Registration) Bill which eventually passed as the Architects (Registration) Act in 1931, leading to the creation of the Architects' Registration Council of the United Kingdom (ARCUK). The IAAS was among the professional bodies entitled to appoint members to ARCUK. However, subsequent legislation, including the Architects Act 1997, repealed this arrangement, and IAAS (then ABE) ceased to have that appointing role.

In the 21st century, CABE expanded its international presence, setting up its first overseas office in Hong Kong in 2020, reflecting its growing membership base outside the UK, particularly in Asia-Pacific regions such as Hong Kong, Malaysia, Singapore, and others. The Hong Kong chapter represents the organization’s largest membership outside the UK and Ireland, signaling CABE’s increasing global footprint. Since 2008 CABE has held a license to award registration with Society for the Environment; CABE members may apply for registration as Chartered Environmentalist (CEnv), Registered Environmental Practitioner (REnvP) or Registered Environmental Technician (REnvTech). Since 2020 CABE has been registered with the Engineering Council and its members may apply for registration as Chartered Engineer (CEng), Incorporated Engineer (IEng), and Engineering Technician (EngTech).

== Governance ==
CABE is a membership organisation and is governed by a board of directors that sets the objectives of the organisation – the executive team deliver these objectives. Entry to membership of CABE is via several routes and members must undertake continuing professional development throughout the lifetime of their membership of the association in order to maintain their professional standards.

=== Regions and chapters ===
CABE has 12 regions in the United Kingdom and Ireland each with elected Chairman, Secretary, Treasurer and Committee. In addition, CABE has chapters operate in, Australia, Malaysia, Hong Kong, Singapore, Middle East, Macau, and USA.

== Membership and professional qualification ==
CABE has a structured membership system with associated post-nominal letters reflecting professional status and expertise. The grades are: Student Member (no post-nominal), Technician Member (Tech CABE), Associate Member (ACABE), Graduate Member (Grad CABE), Chartered Member (MCABE), Member Chartered Building Engineer (MCABE C.Build E), and Fellow Chartered Building Engineer (FCABE C.Build E). Chartered Members (MCABE) are recognised for maintaining high ethical standards and professional competence, while Chartered Building Engineers (MCABE C.Build E) denote advanced technical expertise and are recognised under CABE’s Royal Charter. The highest accolade is Fellow Chartered Building Engineer (FCABE C.Build E), awarded to those demonstrating exceptional leadership and dedication to advancing building engineering.

=== Chartered Building Engineer ===
Chartered Building Engineer (C.Build E) is a professional qualification which holder demonstrates a commitment to maintaining high ethical standards, professionalism, and technical competence. The title of Chartered Building Engineer, often abbreviated as "C.Build E", is recognized under the Association's Royal Charter and underscores the bearer's commitment to excellence in the field of building engineering.

=== Registered Building Inspector ===
CABE is one of the Building Inspector Competence Assessment Scheme provider to validate the professional competence of building inspectors in the England and Wales before registering with the Building Safety Regulator after the enactment of the Building Safety Act 2022.

== Coat of arms ==
Coat of arms of Chartered Association of Building Engineers

Notes
Granted 24 January 1955
Crest
On a wreath Or Gules and Azure a representation of the Parthenon Proper.
Escutcheon
Quarterly Gules and Azure a fesse embattled between three lions' faces Or.
Supporters
On the dexter side a figure representing an architect of the seventeenth century holding in the exterior hand a plan of St. Paul's Cathedral and on the sinister side a surveyor of the same period holding in the exterior hand a surveyor's pole and over the shoulder a surveyor's chain all Proper.

== See also ==
- Architectural engineering
- Architects' Registration Council of the United Kingdom
- Architects Registration Board
- Architectural technologist
- Building engineer
- Faculty of Architects and Surveyors
- Society of Architects (1884-1925)
- Society of Professional Engineers UK
- Reform of Architects Registration
