= Society of Architects =

British organisation of architects (1884–1925)

The Society of Architects was an organisation of architects that was formed in 1884 and continued until 1925. At that time Fellows and Associates comprised two distinct classes of membership of the Royal Institute of British Architects (RIBA). They were respectively entitled to use the post-nominal affix "FRIBA" or "ARIBA". The formation of the Society of Architects was a result of a campaign by a group of associates to be allowed to vote on the affairs of the Institute which the Fellowship class had resisted.

== Overview ==
In the course of events (see Chronology in Architects Registration in the United Kingdom) which resulted in the passing of the Architects (Registration) Act, 1931, a body was formed called the Architects Registration Bill Committee. Bills for statutory registration of architects which this Committee put forward in 1889 and 1891 were strongly supported by the Society of Architects. In 1902 the Committee and the Society of Architects joined forces as a joint Registration Committee.

In 1905, the RIBA formed a new class for Licentiate members, for whom the post-nominal affix was "LRIBA" This class was for architects who could show evidence of competence, without examinations. When the class was closed in 1913, over 2,000 had been accepted.

In 1925, an increase in the numerical strength of the RIBA was effected when the Society of Architects amalgamated and most of the Society's members transferred to the Licenciate class, which had been reopened. But at about the same time the Incorporated Association of Architects and Surveyors (IAAS) was formed, which opposed a draft bill presented to Parliament in 1927 by the RIBA Registration Committee.

When eventually the Architects' Registration Council of the United Kingdom (ARCUK) came to be established under the Architects (Registration) Act, 1931 with the duty of setting up, maintaining and publishing the Register of Architects, the First Schedule of the Act prescribed that the Councils of certain bodies would be entitled to appoint one member in respect of 500 of their own members; and in the case of the RIBA and the IAAS, this was to be in respect of their own fellows, associates or licentiates.

== See also ==
- Incorporated Association of Architects and Surveyors
- Faculty of Architects and Surveyors
- Architects Registration Board
- Reform of Architects Registration
