= Neville Bulwer-Lytton, 3rd Earl of Lytton =

British military officer

The Right Honourable The Earl of Lytton OBE
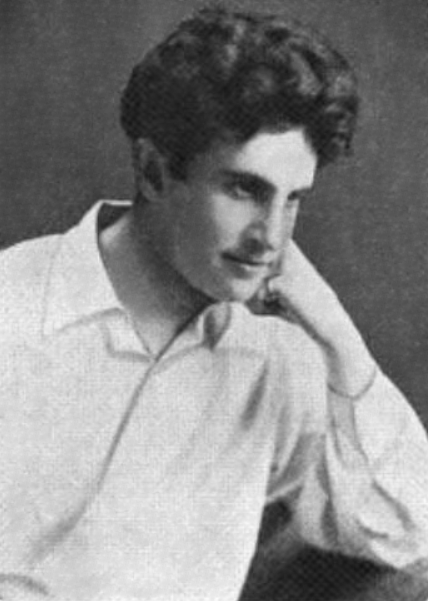
- In The Sketch in 1904

Member of the House of Lords
- Lord Temporal
- In office 25 October 1947 – 9 February 1951
- Preceded by: The 2nd Earl of Lytton
- Succeeded by: The 4th Earl of Lytton

Personal details
- Born: Neville Stephen Bulwer-Lytton; 6 February 1879 British India
- Died: 9 February 1951 (aged 72) Paris, France
- Spouses: Judith Blunt, Baroness Wentworth (m. 1899; div. 1923) Rosa Alexandra Fortel (m. 1924)
- Children: 4
- Parents: Robert Bulwer-Lytton, 1st Earl of Lytton; Edith Villiers
- Education: Eton College
- Alma mater: École des Beaux-Arts
- Sports career
Medal record
Representing Great Britain
Jeu de paume
Olympic Games
| Bronze medal – third place | 1908 London | Individual |

Neville Stephen Bulwer-Lytton, 3rd Earl of Lytton, OBE (6 February 1879 – 9 February 1951) was a British Army officer, Olympian and artist.

== Early life ==
Neville Lytton was born in British India on 6 February 1879 while his parents served as viceroy and vicereine: Robert Bulwer-Lytton, 1st Earl of Lytton, and Edith Villiers. Neville was the grandson of the famous novelists Edward Bulwer-Lytton and Rosina Doyle Wheeler. His siblings included the suffragette Constance Lytton, Elizabeth Balfour (sister in law of the prime minister), and Emily Lutyens, wife of the architect Edwin Lutyens.

A keen amateur cricketer, he played minor counties cricket for Hertfordshire from 1896 to 1898, making five appearances.

He was educated at Eton College and at the École des Beaux-Arts in Paris. He competed in the 1908 Summer Olympics and won the bronze medal in the real tennis competition.

== Career ==
During World War I, Neville Lytton served as an officer on the Western Front and saw active duty at both the Somme and Amiens. According to the accounts of a contemporary, he was seen as "a gentleman of the old school" and served "with gallantry and distinction". For his service, the French Government decorated him with the Chevalier of the Legion of Honour.

Shortly after the end of the war, both Britain's Imperial War Museum and France's Musée de Guerre acquired examples of his art, some of which had apparently travelled with him on his postings. It is possible to see Lytton's frescos reflecting his experiences in the war on display in Balcombe village's Victory Hall.

From approximately 1900 to 1940, Lytton exhibited his art at such major venues as Alpine Club Gallery, Beaux Arts Gallery, the Dowdeswell Galleries, the Walker Art Gallery (Liverpool), the New English Art Club, the Royal Society of Portrait Painters and at the Royal Academy, London. Neville Lytton was also elected an Associate of the Société Nationale des Beaux Arts, Paris, and exhibited his art there. In 1911, 1912 and 1913, he was international amateur tennis champion.

Following his elder brother's death in 1947, without surviving male issue, Neville Lytton succeeded his brother as the 3rd Earl of Lytton.

== Personal life ==
He married Judith Blunt, later Baroness Wentworth in her own right, in Cairo in 1899. She was the only daughter of the poet Wilfrid Scawen Blunt and his wife Lady Anne Blunt (daughter of the Hon. Ada Lovelace, and granddaughter of Lord Byron). The couple moved to the Blunts' Crabbet Park Stud in England in 1904. Before their divorce in 1923, they were the parents of three children:

- Noel Anthony Scawen Bulwer-Lytton (1900–1985), who became the 4th Earl of Lytton and 17th Baron Wentworth. In 1946 he married Clarissa Mary Palmer, eldest daughter of Brig. Gen. Cyril Eustace Palmer.
- Lady Anne Bulwer-Lytton (1901–1979), who adopted the surname of Lytton-Milbanke in 1925.
- Lady Winifred Bulwer-Lytton (born 1904), who married Claude Tryon, eldest surviving son of John Tryon of Grove Mill House, in 1921.

On 1 May 1924, the Earl remarried to Rosa Alexandra Fortel of Saint-Rambert-en-Bugey in Ain. The family resided in France and with his second wife he was the father to a fourth child:

- Lady Madeleine Elizabeth Lytton (born 1921), a dancer, choreographer and teacher.

Lord Lytton died in Paris on 9 February 1951. He was succeeded by his only son from his first marriage. His widow died in 1980.

=== Legacy ===
A profile sketch of the Earl may be viewed at the National Portrait Gallery, London.

Peerage of the United Kingdom
| Preceded by Victor Bulwer-Lytton | Earl of Lytton; 1947–1951; Member of the House of Lords (1947–1951) | Succeeded by Noel Lytton |
| Preceded by Victor Bulwer-Lytton | Baron Lytton; 1947–1951 | Succeeded by Noel Lytton |
Baronetage of the United Kingdom
| Preceded by Victor Bulwer-Lytton | Baronet of Knebworth House; 1947–1951 | Succeeded by Noel Lytton |
