= The Future of Islam =

Book by Wilfrid Scawen Blunt

- First edition
- Author: Wilfrid Scawen Blunt
- Subject: Islam, Islamic History, Islamic Politics
- Publisher: Kegan Paul, Trench & Co.
- Publication date: 1882
- Publication place: United Kingdom
- Media type: Hardcover
- Pages: 140 pp
- ISBN: 0-5542-7785-9

The Future of Islam is a nonfiction book by English poet and author Wilfrid Scawen Blunt. It was originally published in 1882. It explores many aspects of Islamic politics and the Ottoman Empire at that time.
