= Lucile (poem) =

Verse novel written by Robert Bulwer-Lytton under the pen name Owen Meredith

Lucile is a verse novel written by Robert Bulwer-Lytton under the pen name Owen Meredith, and was published in 1860. The poem is a narrative told in an anapaest meter. It remains Meredith's most popular work, achieving wide popularity in the 19th century, despite accusations of plagiarism involving elements of an 1831 George Sand novella, Lavinia.

In the century following its initial publication, over 2000 editions were produced by nearly 100 publishers.
