= Cameron Cobbold, 1st Baron Cobbold =

British banker (1904–1987)

The Right Honourable The Lord Cobbold KG GCVO PC DL

Governor of the Bank of England
- In office 1 March 1949 – 30 June 1961
- Preceded by: The Lord Catto
- Succeeded by: The Earl of Cromer

Personal details
- Born: Cameron Fromanteel Cobbold; 14 September 1904 London, England
- Died: 1 November 1987 (aged 83) Knebworth, Hertfordshire, England
- Spouse: Lady Hermione Bulwer-Lytton
- Children: 4, including David
- Education: King's College, Cambridge
- Profession: Banker

Cameron Fromanteel Cobbold, 1st Baron Cobbold (14 September 1904 – 1 November 1987) was a British banker. He served as Governor of the Bank of England from 1949 to 1961 and as Lord Chamberlain from 1963 to 1971.

== Early life ==
Born in London in 1904 to Lt.-Col. Clement John Fromanteel Cobbold and his wife Stella Willoughby Savile Cameron, Cobbold was educated at Eton College. He also spent one year at King's College, Cambridge.

== Career ==
=== Bank of England ===
Cobbold joined the Bank of England at the invitation of bank Governor Montagu Norman in 1933. He was appointed Deputy Governor in 1945 and became governor in 1949. During his tenure he was sworn of the Privy Council (1959) and was created Baron Cobbold, of Knebworth in the County of Hertford (1960). He retired as governor in 1961.

=== Cobbold Commission ===
He subsequently led the Cobbold Commission in 1962 which studied the question of North Borneo and Sarawak's merger with Malaya to form Malaysia. In 1963, he was appointed a Knight Grand Cross of the Royal Victorian Order and Lord Chamberlain to Queen Elizabeth II. He served until 1971, and during his tenure the Lord Chamberlain's theatrical censorship role was abolished (1968) and he was appointed to the Order of the Garter (1970). Cobbold was appointed to be a Deputy Lieutenant of the County of Hertford (1972).

In 1966, he received the Grand Decoration in Gold with Sash for Services to the Republic of Austria.

== Marriage and children ==
On 3 April 1930, Cobbold married Lady Hermione Millicent Bulwer-Lytton, daughter and heir of Victor Bulwer-Lytton, 2nd Earl of Lytton. Their seat was at Knebworth House in Hertfordshire. They had two daughters and two sons:

- Jane Cobbold (10 May 1931 – 16 February 1937)
- The Hon. Susan Victoria Cobbold (24 May 1933 - 14 December 2021)
- David Antony Fromanteel Lytton Cobbold, 2nd Baron Cobbold (14 July 1937 – 9 May 2022)
- The Hon. Rowland John Fromanteel Cobbold (born 20 June 1944)

Lord Cobbold died at Knebworth in November 1987, aged 83. He was succeeded in the barony by his elder son, David.

== Arms ==
Coat of arms of Cameron Fromanteel Cobbold, 1st Baron Cobbold, KG, GCVO, PC, DL
Coronet A Baron's Coronet Crest A lion statant guardant Argent ducally crowned Azure resting the dexter paw on an escutcheon Vert charged with three escutcheons each Argent a border engrailed Or. Escutcheon Sable a chevron Or between in chief two bezants and in base a lion passant guardant Or on a chief dancetty Or two ducal coronets Azure. Supporters On either side a golden labrador proper resting the inner hind foot on a battering ram fesswise also proper garnished and the heads inwards Azure. Motto REBUS ANGUSTIS FORTIS (Brave in adversity)

Honorary titles
Preceded by Sir Otto Niemeyer	High Sheriff of the County of London; 1946–1947	Succeeded by Laurence Cadbury
Government offices
Preceded by The Lord Catto	Governor of the Bank of England; 1949–1961	Succeeded by The Earl of Cromer
Court offices
Preceded by The Earl of Scarbrough	Lord Chamberlain; 1963–1971	Succeeded by The Lord Maclean
Peerage of the United Kingdom
New creation	Baron Cobbold; 1960–1987	Succeeded by David Lytton Cobbold
