= Judith Blunt-Lytton, 16th Baroness Wentworth =

British peer, Arabian horse breeder and real tennis player (1873–1957)

The Right Honourable The Baroness Wentworth
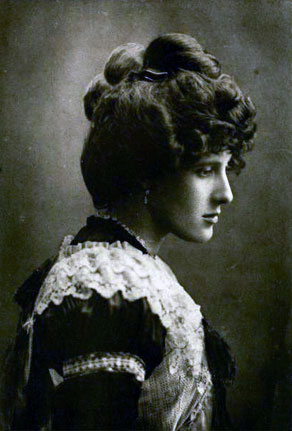
- Born: 6 February 1873
- Died: 8 August 1957 (aged 84)
- Occupation: Arabian horse breeder
- Spouse: Neville Lytton (m. 1899; div. 1923)
- Children: Noel Lytton, 4th Earl of Lytton; Lady Anne Lytton-Milbanke; Lady Winifrid Tryon
- Parent(s): Wilfrid Scawen Blunt; Anne Blunt, 15th Baroness Wentworth

Judith Anne Dorothea Blunt-Lytton, 16th Baroness Wentworth (6 February 1873 – 8 August 1957), also known as Lady Wentworth, was a British peeress, Arabian horse breeder and real tennis player. As the owner of the Crabbet Arabian Stud from 1917 to 1957, her influence on Arabian horse breeding was profound, with over 90 per cent of all Arabian horses in the world today carrying lines to Crabbet bloodstock in their pedigrees.

== Early life and family ==
Judith was the only surviving child of the poet Wilfrid Scawen Blunt and his wife, Lady Anne, a daughter of William King-Noel, 1st Earl of Lovelace, and his wife, the renowned mathematician Ada Lovelace. Therefore, she was also the great-granddaughter of Lord Byron. Judith spent most of her childhood in Egypt and other parts of the Middle East while her parents travelled to purchase Arabian horses for their Crabbet Arabian Stud back in England and their Sheykh Obeyd stud in Cairo. Thus, the family was familiar with middle eastern culture and spoke fluent Arabic and Turkish.

== Adult life ==
On 2 February 1899, Judith married Neville Stephen Lytton, the youngest son of the Earl of Lytton. The marriage took place in Cairo; when they returned to England, they moved into a house in the grounds of her parents' estate, Crabbet Park, near Crawley, filled with relics of Judith's great-grandfather, Lord Byron. The couple had three children: Noel Anthony Scawen (1900–1985), Anne (later known as Lady Anne Lytton) (1901–1979) and Winifred (later known as Lady Winifrid Tryon) (1904–1985). The couple became estranged, and divorced in 1923. Neville soon remarried, but Lady Wentworth never did, focusing on managing Crabbet Park until her death.

In 1904, Judith's father turned over the Crabbet property to her; she changed her surname to Blunt-Lytton that year. Two years later, her estranged parents divided the estate, Wilfrid living close by at Newbuildings Place, while Lady Anne remained in Egypt, managing the Sheykh Obeyd Stud as a breeding centre for Arabian horses.

Lady Wentworth and her prized Arabian stallion, Skowronek.

In 1917, Judith inherited her mother's barony of Wentworth. Due primarily to the maneuvering of Wilfrid in an attempt to disinherit Judith and obtain the entire Crabbet property, Judith and her mother were estranged at the time and thus Lady Anne's share of the Crabbet Stud passed to Judith's daughters, under the oversight of an independent trustee. This angered Wilfrid and a lawsuit soon followed. Ownership of the Arabian horses went back and forth between the estates of father and daughter in the following years. Wilfrid sold a number of horses in his control, mostly to pay off debts. Some animals were later repurchased by Judith, though she was unable to recover others, especially those exported to the United States. The lawsuit was eventually settled in favour of the granddaughters and Judith. Between her own pre-existing ownership and the shares of the estate she purchased from the trustee for her daughters, Judith retained control of the Stud, though she had to overcome considerable financial difficulties.

Judith was a respected breeder of King Charles Spaniels and a dog judge. In 1911 her authoritative work on the ancestors of several of the toy dog breeds was published.

== Death and legacy ==
Lady Wentworth's former husband had inherited his brother's Lytton earldom in 1947, and on his own death in 1951, it passed to their only son, Noel. Lady Wentworth had become estranged from her children since the divorce and saw Noel for the first time in 30 years on her deathbed in 1957. At the time of her death, the Wentworth title also passed to him. Her daughter, Lady Anne Lytton, later provided valuable historical recollections of the horses and practices of the Crabbet Stud.

One of Britain's other important collections of Arab horses was Hanstead Stud, also run by a mother and daughter, Annie Henrietta Yule and Gladys Meryl Yule. The former died in 1950 and the latter within a few weeks of Lady Wentworth in 1957. The deaths of these two only children, at a time of high post-war inheritance tax, meant that in 1957 a substantial number of British-bred Arabian horses left the country, improving the breed's bloodlines elsewhere. About a dozen from each stud went to Bazy Tankersley's Al-Marah Arabians in the United States.

Lady Wentworth's will stipulated that Crabbet be left to her stud manager and real tennis marker Fred Covey, but he had died a few days earlier than Lady Wentworth, thus the Stud passed to his son, Cecil. The house remains to this day, but when the new M23 motorway bisected the property in 1971, Covey, himself not a young man, had little choice but to sell the property and disperse the horses.

== Publications ==
- Toy Dogs and their Ancestors (1911)
- Love in a Mist (Arden Press, 1913)
- Thoroughbred Racing Stock and its Ancestors: the authentic origin of pure blood (G. Allen & Unwin, 1938)
- War Nonsense (poems, 1943)
- British Horses and Ponies (Hon-no-Tomosha, 1944)
- Arab horse nonsense (1950)
- Drift of the Storm (G. Ronald, 1951)
- Horses in the Making (Allen & Unwin, 1951)
- The poems of Lady Wentworth: Volume 1 (1951)
- Passing Hours: Volume II in the series of Lady Wentworth's poetry (1952)
- The English country gentleman (Hurst & Blackett)
- Ponies past, present and future (1955)
- The Swift Runner: racing speed through the ages (G. Allen & Unwin, 1957)
- The Crabbet Arabian stud (1957)
- The World's Best Horse (1958)
- Arabian type and standard
- The authentic Arabian Horse and his Descendants: three voices concerning the horses of Arabia (Crown Publishers, 1963

== Sources ==
- Wentworth, Judith Anne Dorothea Blunt-Lytton (1979). The Authentic Arabian Horse (3rd ed.). London: George Allen & Unwin Ltd. ISBN 9780046360108.
- Cadranell, R. J. (March–April 1993). "Lady Wentworth in The Times" (Includes obituary of Lady Wentworth). CMK Arabian Horses. Arabian Visions. Archived from the original on 8 February 2023.
- The Welara Registry
- The Androom Archives
- Burke's Peerage & Gentry
- Arabian Bloodlines – Crabbet

Peerage of England
Preceded by Anne Blunt	Baroness Wentworth; 1917–1957	Succeeded by Noel Lytton
