= Litton (surname) =

Litton is a surname. Notable people with the surname include:

- Abram Litton (19th century), American professor of chemistry
- Andrew Litton (born 1959), American orchestral conductor
- Ashley Litton (born 1983), American beauty queen
- Charles Litton Sr. (1904–1972), American engineer and inventor
- Chase Litton (born 1995), American football player
- Drew Litton (born 1958), American cartoonist
- Edward Litton (1787–1870), Irish Member of Parliament (MP) for Coleraine 1837–1843
- Edward Falconer Litton (1827–1890), Irish Member of Parliament for Tyrone 1880–1841
- George Litton (born 1935), American football coach.
- Greg Litton (born 1964), American baseball player
- Henry Litton (born 1934), Hong Kong judge
- James Litton, American choral conductor
- Jerry Litton (1937–1976), American politician
- Marie Litton, stage name of Mary Jessie Lowe (1847–1884), English actress and theatre manager
- Martin Litton (environmentalist) (1917–2014), American conservationist
- Martin Litton (pianist) (born 1957), British jazz pianist
- Ray Litton (1931–2014), American baseball player, city manager and mayor

== See also ==
- Lytton (surname)
