= Henry Lytton Cobbold, 3rd Baron Cobbold =

British screenwriter (born 1962)

The Right Honourable The Lord Cobbold
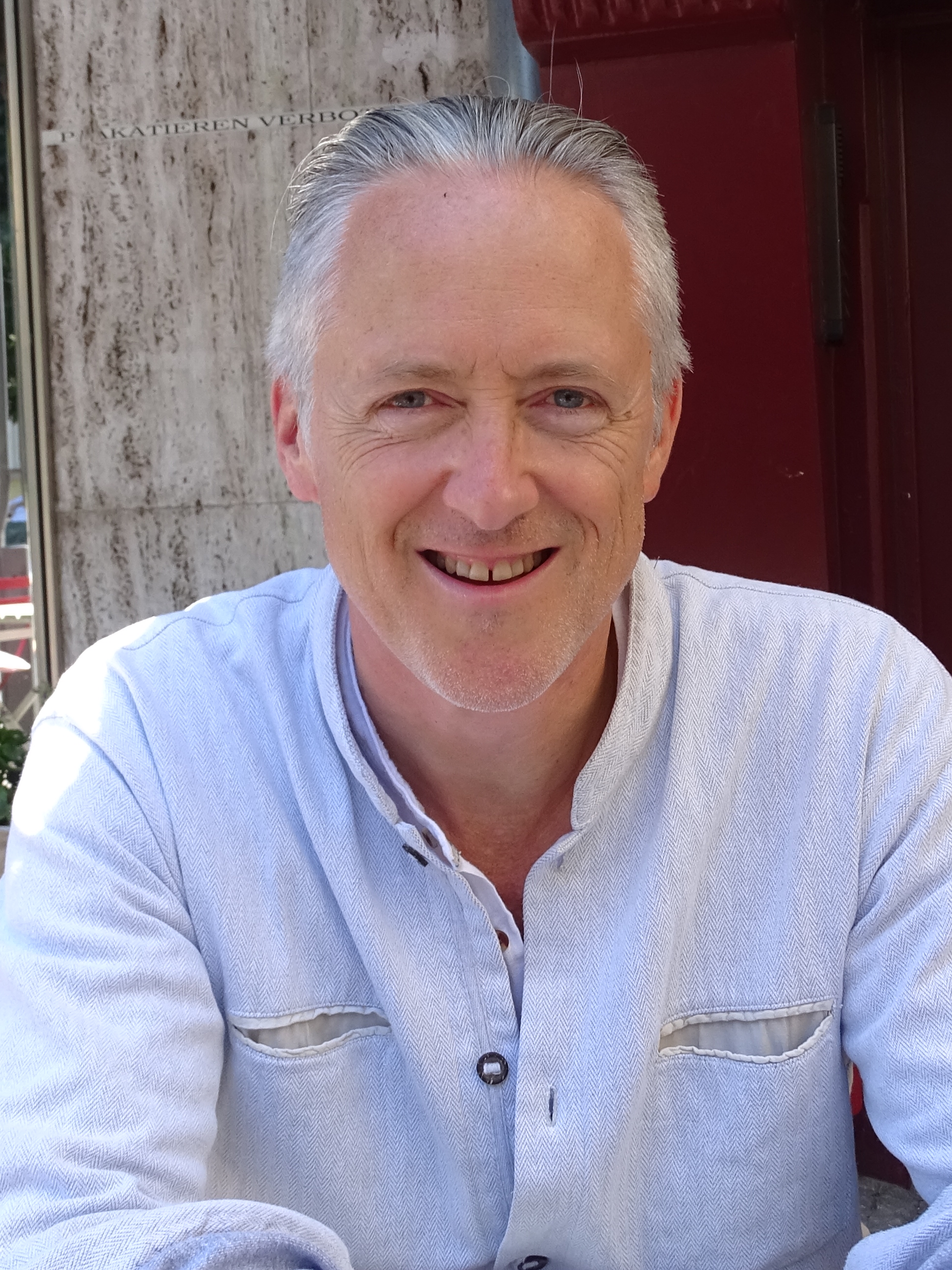
- Lytton Cobbold in 2017
- Born: 12 May 1962 (age 64)
- Occupation: Screenwriter
- Spouse: Martha Boone
- Children: 2
- Parent(s): David Lytton Cobbold, 2nd Baron Cobbold; Christina Elizabeth Stucley
- Writing career
- Notable works: In the Bosom of Her Father – The Life and Death of Emily Bulwer Lytton

Henry Fromanteel Lytton Cobbold, 3rd Baron Cobbold (born 12 May 1962), is a British screenwriter. He is the current occupant of Knebworth House in Hertfordshire, England.

He is the son of David Lytton Cobbold, 2nd Baron Cobbold, and succeeded his father in the Cobbold barony in May 2022. He is married to Martha Boone, with two children, Morwenna Gray and Edward. He is a great-great-great-grandson of novelist Edward Bulwer-Lytton.

Trained as a screenwriter, Lytton Cobbold was an assistant to the filming of The Shooting Party, part of which was filmed at Knebworth House, and subsequently worked on Water. From 1987 to 1993, he lived in Los Angeles, and scripted several TV shows, including Lake Consequence. He returned to Britain and lived in Knebworth village until 2000, when he took over the daily running of Knebworth House from his father. He continued to practise his trade during this period, scripting "Night of Abandon", an episode of the Red Shoe Diaries, in 1997.

In 2008 he engaged in a debate with Scott Rice, founder of the Bulwer-Lytton Fiction Contest, a bad-writing contest sponsored annually by San Jose State University, on the subject of the literary reputation of his ancestor Bulwer-Lytton. Cobbold later stated that he had won the debate. The debate took place in Lytton, British Columbia, named after the novelist; the mayor made it clear that the town was backing the Bulwer-Lytton side. In 2017 Lytton Cobbold published a two-volume book about Emily Bulwer-Lytton, the daughter of his ancestor Edward Bulwer-Lytton.

== Publications ==
Henry Lytton Cobbold and Mary Letitia Greene: In the Bosom of Her Father – The Life and Death of Emily Bulwer Lytton, complete illustrated edition in two volumes, Knebworth 2017, ISBN 978-0-9539649-5-6

Peerage of the United Kingdom
Preceded by David Lytton Cobbold	Baron Cobbold; 2022	Incumbent
