= David Lytton Cobbold, 2nd Baron Cobbold =

British peer (1937–2022)

The Right Honourable The Lord Cobbold DL
- Cobbold in 2014

Member of the House of Lords
- Lord Temporal
- Hereditary peerage 1 March 1988 – 11 November 1999
- Preceded by: The 1st Baron Cobbold
- Succeeded by: Seat abolished
- Elected Hereditary Peer; 6 June 2000 – 13 October 2014
- Preceded by: The 11th Baroness Wharton
- Succeeded by: The 19th Duke of Somerset

Personal details
- Born: David Antony Fromanteel Cobbold; 14 July 1937
- Died: 9 May 2022 (aged 84)
- Party: Crossbencher
- Spouse: Christine Stucley (m. 1961)
- Children: 4, including Henry
- Parent(s): Cameron Cobbold, 1st Baron Cobbold; Lady Hermione Bulwer-Lytton

David Antony Fromanteel Lytton Cobbold, 2nd Baron Cobbold (14 July 1937 – 9 May 2022), was a British hereditary peer and member of the House of Lords.

== Early life ==
He was born David Antony Fromanteel Cobbold, the elder son of Cameron "Kim" Cobbold (who would be created Baron Cobbold in 1960) and Lady Hermione Bulwer-Lytton. He changed his surname to "Lytton Cobbold" by deed poll on 10 January 1961. He was a member of the Lytton family (the Earls of Lytton) through his mother. In keeping with family tradition, Cobbold was educated at Eton and studied Moral Sciences at Trinity College, Cambridge.

== Banking career ==
Lytton Cobbold was an executive in the International Banking Department of Bank of London and South America (BOLSA) in the late 1960s, under Edward Clifton-Brown. BOLSA was one of the first banks in the Eurodollar market, developed by Sir George Bolton, Chairman of BOLSA. He was increasingly drawn into the management of Knebworth House, for public events, so he left banking and dedicated himself to the house and estate.

== House of Lords ==
Lytton Cobbold inherited the Cobbold barony upon the death of his father on 1 November 1987. He was appointed a Deputy Lieutenant (DL) by the Lord Lieutenant of Hertfordshire on 8 June 1993. He was one of the ninety hereditary peers elected to remain in the House of Lords after the passing of the House of Lords Act 1999. A runner-up in the initial election that year, he replaced Ziki Robertson, 11th Baroness Wharton, following her death on 15 May 2000.

On 13 October 2014, he became the second person to resign his membership of the House under the House of Lords Reform Act 2014, and the first elected hereditary peer to do so.

== Marriage and children ==
On 7 January 1961, he married Christine Elizabeth Stucley, one of the last generation of debutantes to be presented to Queen Elizabeth II in 1958. They had four children:

- Henry Fromanteel Lytton Cobbold, 3rd Baron Cobbold (born 12 May 1962)
- The Hon. Peter Guy Fromanteel Lytton Cobbold (born 25 November 1964)
- The Hon. Richard Stucley Fromanteel Lytton Cobbold (born 31 July 1968)
- The Hon. Rosina Kim Lytton Cobbold (born 14 December 1971)

Lord Cobbold died on 9 May 2022, aged 84, and was succeeded in the barony by his eldest son, Henry.

== Notes ==
Peerage of the United Kingdom
Preceded by Cameron Cobbold	Baron Cobbold; 1987–2022; Member of the House of Lords (1988–1999)	Succeeded by Henry Lytton Cobbold
Parliament of the United Kingdom
Preceded by The Baroness Wharton	Elected hereditary peer to the House of Lords under the House of Lords Act 1999; 2000–2014	Succeeded by The Duke of Somerset
