= Lytton, West Virginia =

Lytton
- Unincorporated community
- Location within the state of West Virginia Lytton (the United States)
- Coordinates: 39°27′35″N 81°4′40″W
- Country: United States
- State: West Virginia
- County: Pleasants
- Elevation: 1,060 ft (320 m)
- Time zone: UTC-5 (Eastern (EST))
  - Summer (DST): UTC-4 (EDT)
- GNIS ID: 1678534

Lytton was an unincorporated community in Pleasants County, West Virginia, United States.
