= Robert Bulwer-Lytton, 1st Earl of Lytton =

British Viceroy of India, diplomat and author (1831–1891)

His Excellency The Right Honourable The Earl of Lytton GCB GCSI GCIE PC
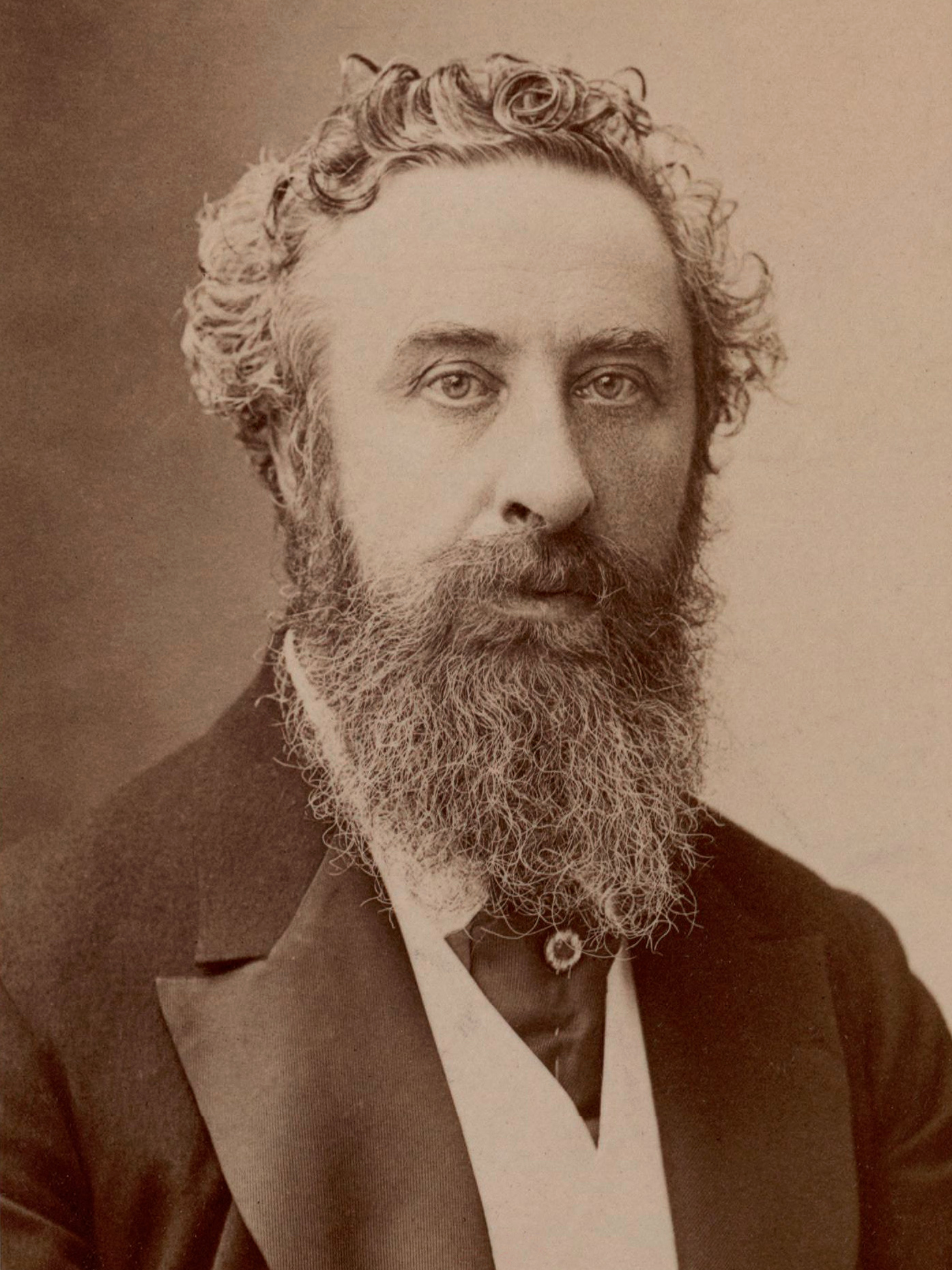
- Photograph by Nadar, c. 1890s

Viceroy and Governor-General of India
- In office 12 April 1876 – 8 June 1880
- Monarch: Queen Victoria
- Preceded by: The Earl of Northbrook
- Succeeded by: The Marquess of Ripon

British Ambassador to France
- In office 1887–1891
- Monarch: Queen Victoria
- Preceded by: The Viscount Lyons
- Succeeded by: The Marquess of Dufferin and Ava

Personal details
- Born: 8 November 1831 London, England
- Died: 24 November 1891 (aged 60) Paris, France
- Party: Conservative
- Spouse: Edith Villiers (m. 1864)
- Children: 7, including Victor and Constance
- Parent(s): Edward Bulwer-Lytton; Rosina Doyle Wheeler
- Education: University of Bonn

Edward Robert Lytton Bulwer-Lytton, 1st Earl of Lytton (8 November 1831 – 24 November 1891), was a British statesman, Conservative politician and poet who used the pseudonym Owen Meredith. During his tenure as Viceroy of India between 1876 and 1880, Queen Victoria was proclaimed Empress of India. He served as British Ambassador to France from 1887 to 1891.

His tenure as Viceroy was controversial for its ruthlessness in both domestic and foreign affairs, especially for his handling of the Great Famine of 1876–1878 and the Second Anglo-Afghan War. His son Victor Bulwer-Lytton, 2nd Earl of Lytton, who was born in India, later served as Governor of Bengal and briefly as acting Viceroy. The senior earl was also the father-in-law of the architect Sir Edwin Lutyens, who designed New Delhi.

Lytton was a protégé of Benjamin Disraeli in domestic affairs, and of Richard Lyons, 1st Viscount Lyons, who was his predecessor as Ambassador to France, in foreign affairs. His tenure as Ambassador to Paris was successful, and Lytton was afforded the rare tribute – especially for an Englishman – of a French state funeral in Paris.

== Childhood and education ==
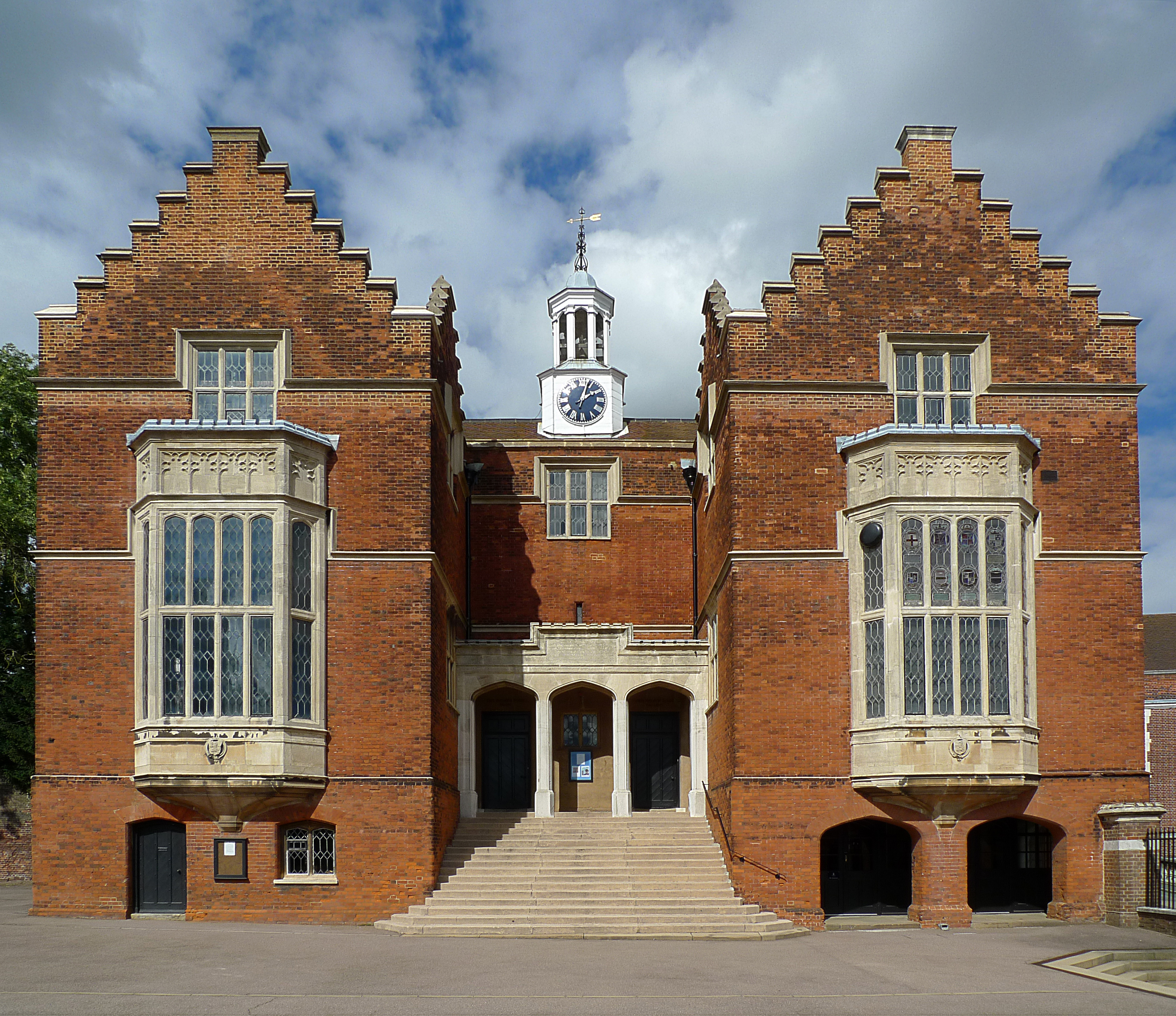
Harrow School

Lytton was the son of the novelists Edward Bulwer-Lytton and Rosina Doyle Wheeler (who was the daughter of the early women's rights advocate Anna Wheeler). His uncle was Sir Henry Bulwer. His childhood was spoiled by the altercations of his parents, who separated acrimoniously when he was a boy. However, Lytton received the patronage of John Forster – an influential friend of Leigh Hunt, Charles Lamb, Walter Savage Landor, and Charles Dickens – who was generally considered to be the first professional biographer of 19th century England.

Lytton's mother, who lost access to her children, satirised his father in her 1839 novel Cheveley, or the Man of Honour. His father subsequently had his mother placed under restraint, as a consequence of an assertion of her insanity, which provoked public outcry and her liberation a few weeks later. His mother chronicled this episode in her memoirs.

After being taught at home for a while, he was educated in schools in Twickenham and Brighton and thence Harrow, and at the University of Bonn.

== Diplomatic career ==
Lytton entered the Diplomatic Service in 1849, when aged 18, when he was appointed as attaché to his uncle, Sir Henry Bulwer, who was Minister at Washington, DC. It was at this time he met Henry Clay and Daniel Webster. He began his salaried diplomatic career in 1852 as an attaché to Florence, and subsequently served in Paris, in 1854, and in The Hague, in 1856 . In 1858, he served in St Petersburg, Constantinople, and Vienna. In 1860, he was appointed British consul-general at Belgrade.

In 1862, Lytton was promoted to Second Secretary in Vienna, but his success in Belgrade made Lord Russell appoint him, in 1863, as Secretary of the Legation at Copenhagen, during his tenure as which he twice acted as Chargé d'Affaires in the Schleswig-Holstein conflict. In 1864, Lytton was transferred to the Greek court to advise the young Danish Prince. In 1865, he served in Lisbon, where he concluded a major commercial treaty with Portugal, and subsequently in Madrid. He subsequently became Secretary to the Embassy at Vienna and, in 1872, to Richard Lyons, 1st Viscount Lyons, who was Ambassador to Paris. By 1874, Lytton was appointed British Minister Plenipotentiary at Lisbon where he remained until being appointed Governor General and Viceroy of India in 1876.

== Viceroy of India (1876–1880) ==
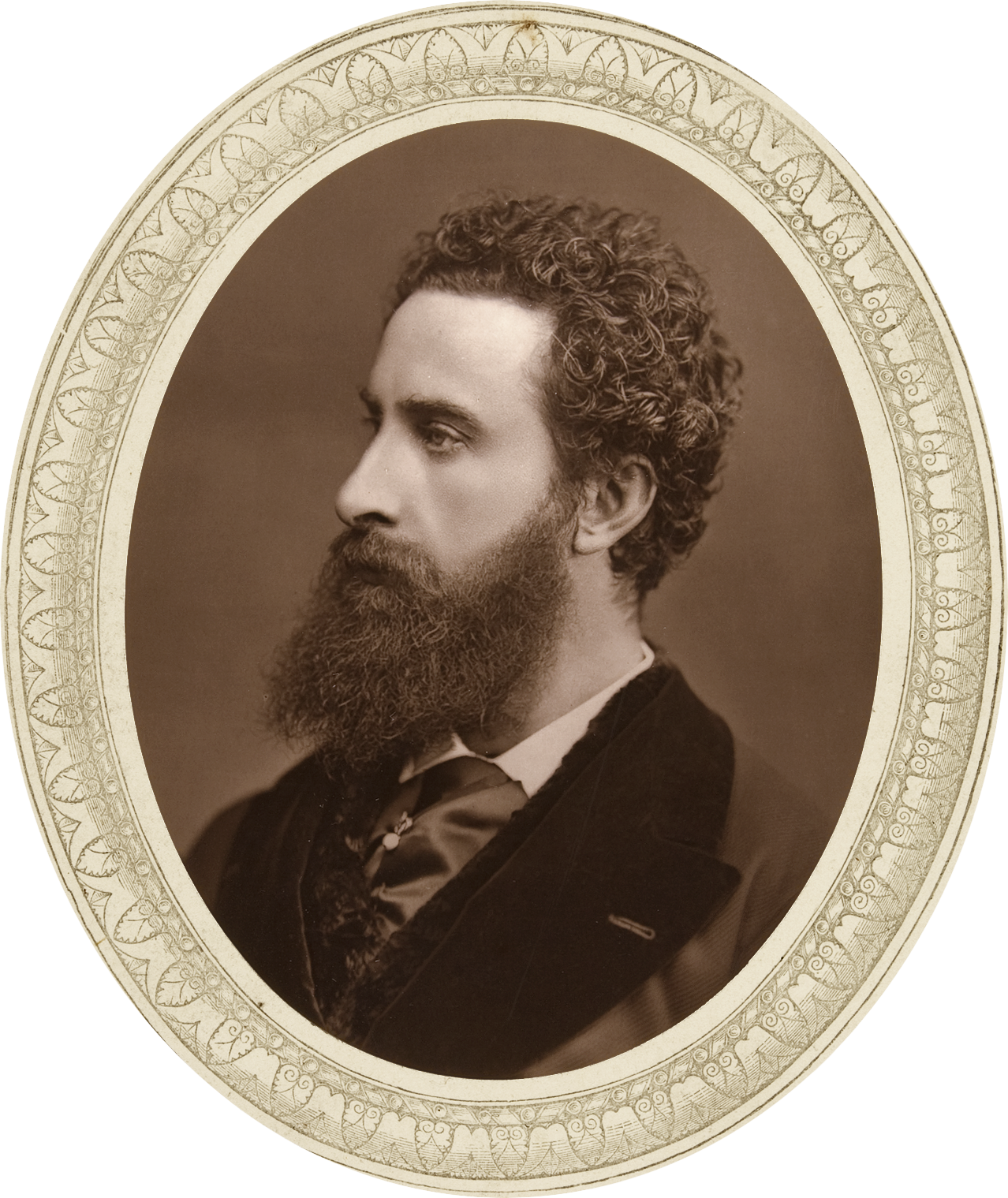
Edward Robert Bulwer-Lytton, 1st Earl of Lytton

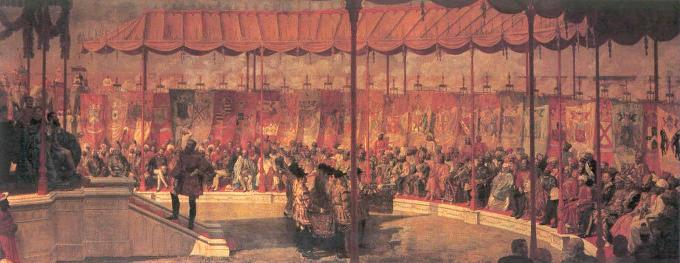
The Delhi Durbar of 1877 at Coronation Park. The Viceroy of India, Lord Lytton is seated on the dais to the left

After turning down an appointment as governor of Madras, Lytton's appointment as Viceroy of India was announced in 1876. As he was a man of letters instead of a politician, the appointment caused "general astonishment", but the appointment owed something to Disraeli's appreciation of Lytton's literary sensibilities.

On his journey to India, he met up in Egypt with the Prince of Wales, who was returning from his own Indian tour, by prior arrangement. He arrived in India and on 12 April 1876 was installed as viceroy.

=== Domestic policies ===
==== Delhi Durbar ====
The first great occasion of Lytton's viceroyalty was the Delhi Durbar on 1 January 1877, known as the "Proclamation Durbar", to mark Queen Victoria's acceptance of the title of Empress of India. The durbar was attended 68,000 people and 15,000 British and Indian troops: it marked symbolically the beginnings of Britain's alliance with the Indian princes, who pledged their alliance to the new Empress.

Lord Lytton presided over the proceedings in the robes of the Grand Master of the Order of the Star of India. He read a speech, in which he announced the creation of the Order of the Indian Empire.

The Durbar was out of touch to the Indians. Lakhs of rupees were spent on the event but nothing was done for Indians who were in the grip of a famine.

He was created a GCB in late 1877, at the end of his first year in office.

==== Great Famine ====
The most significant domestic crisis of Lytton's viceroyalty was the Great Famine of 1876–1878, which began shortly after he took office and caused several million deaths. Estimates vary considerably, with modern studies generally placing the death toll between approximately 5.5 million and 9 million.

Although drought and crop failures triggered the famine, historians have argued that the policies adopted by Lytton's administration substantially increased its severity. Lytton opposed government measures intended to reduce grain prices and supported a policy of non-interference in private trade. His administration also sought to minimise expenditure on famine relief, while continuing to collect revenue and pursuing wider fiscal objectives.

Sir Richard Temple was sent to supervise relief expenditure and introduced strict eligibility requirements, compulsory labour and a reduced subsistence allowance known as the "Temple wage" or "Temple ration". The ration provided approximately one pound of grain per day to adult labourers performing strenuous work and was criticised as insufficient to prevent severe malnutrition and disease.

Economic historian Lalit Mohan Gujral argued that Lytton wanted the famine to be administered as economically as possible in order to maintain a budget surplus and enable the reduction of import duties on British cotton goods. Other historians have similarly identified the colonial government's commitment to laissez-faire economics, free trade and fiscal restraint as important factors that worsened mortality.

During the famine, grain continued to be traded and exported from India rather than being requisitioned or subjected to price controls. Lytton's government maintained that market prices would encourage supplies to enter affected regions and rejected extensive state intervention. Critics, including William Digby and Dadabhai Naoroji, accused the administration of prioritising financial orthodoxy and imperial interests over the preservation of life.

Lytton was also criticised for holding the lavish Delhi Durbar of 1877 while famine was spreading across southern and western India. After the famine, he appointed a commission under Sir Richard Strachey, whose recommendations contributed to the development of provincial famine codes and a famine-relief fund.

==== Vernacular Press Act ====
In 1878, he implemented the Vernacular Press Act, which enabled the Viceroy to confiscate the press and paper of any Indian Vernacular newspaper that published content that the Government deemed to be "seditious", in response to which there was a public protest in Calcutta that was led by the Indian Association and Surendranath Banerjee.

One of the key reasons for passing this act, apart from the onset of the Second Anglo-Afghan War (1878–80), was the reception of the Durbar in the local atmosphere. Durbars held different meanings for Britons, Anglo-Indians, and Indians. While European and Anglo-Indian media, along with agencies like Reuters, praised the Durbars, the Indian press was openly critical. To suppress this dissent, the Vernacular Press Act (VPA) was unanimously passed by the Viceroy's Council on 14 March 1878.

=== Second Anglo-Afghan War, 1878–1880 ===
Britain was deeply concerned throughout the 1870s about Russian attempts to increase its influence in Afghanistan, which provided a Central Asian buffer state between the Russian Empire and British India. Lytton had been given express instructions to recover the friendship of the Amir of Afghanistan, Sher Ali Khan, who was perceived at this point to have sided with Russia against Britain, and made every effort to do so for eighteen months. In September 1878, Lytton sent General Sir Neville Bowles Chamberlain as an emissary to Afghanistan, but he was refused entry. Considering himself left with no real alternative, in November 1878, Lytton ordered an invasion which sparked the Second Anglo-Afghan War.

The British won virtually all the major battles of this war, and in the final settlement, the Treaty of Gandamak, saw a government installed under a new amir which was both by personality and law receptive to British demands; however, the human and material costs of the conflict provoked extensive controversy, particularly among the nascent Indian press, which questioned why Lytton spent so much money prosecuting the conflict with Afghanistan instead of focusing on famine relief. This, along with the massacre of British diplomat Sir Louis Cavagnari and his staff by mutinying Afghan soldiers, contributed to the defeat of Disraeli's Conservative government by Gladstone's Liberals in 1880.

The war was seen at the time as an ignominious but barely acceptable end to the "Great Game", closing a long chapter of conflict with the Russian Empire without even a proxy engagement. The pyrrhic victory of British arms in India was a quiet embarrassment which played a small but critical role in the nascent scramble for Africa; in this way, Lytton and his war helped shape the contours of the 20th century in dramatic and unexpected ways. Lytton resigned at the same time as the Conservative government. He was the last Viceroy of India to govern an open frontier.

=== Assassination attempt ===
In December 1879, Lytton was the target of an assassination attempt while on tour in Calcutta, but escaped unharmed. The would-be assassin was George Edward Dessa, who suffered from delusions; he was deemed unfit to stand trial and died in an asylum.

=== Commemoration ===
A permanent exhibition in Knebworth House, Hertfordshire, is dedicated to his diplomatic service in India. There is a monument dedicated in his name at Nahan, Himachal Pradesh, India, domestically called Delhi Gate.

== Domestic politics ==
In 1880, Lytton resigned his Viceroyalty at the same time that Benjamin Disraeli resigned the premiership. Lytton was created Earl of Lytton, in the County of Derby, and Viscount Knebworth, of Knebworth in the County of Hertford. On 10 January 1881, Lytton made his maiden speech in the House of Lords, in which he censured in Gladstone's devolutionist Afghan policy. In the summer session of 1881, Lytton joined others in opposing Gladstone's second Irish Land Bill. As soon as the summer session was over, he undertook "a solitary ramble about the country". He visited Oxford for the first time, went for a trip on the Thames, and then revisited the hydropathic establishment at Malvern, where he had been with his father as a boy". He saw this as an antidote to the otherwise indulgent lifestyle that came with his career, and used his sojourn there to undertake a critique of a new volume of poetry by his friend Wilfrid Blunt.

== Ambassador to Paris: 1887–1891 ==
Lytton was Ambassador to France from 1887 to 1891. During the second half of the 1880s, before his appointment as Ambassador in 1887, Lytton served as Secretary to the Ambassador to Paris, Lord Lyons. He succeeded Lyons, as Ambassador, subsequent to the resignation of Lyons in 1887. Lytton had previously expressed an interest in the post and enjoyed himself "once more back in his old profession".

Lord Lytton died in Paris on 24 November 1891, where he was given the rare honour of a state funeral. His body was then brought back for interment in the private family mausoleum in Knebworth Park.

A memorial with an inscribed bronze medallion in St Paul's Cathedral was dedicated in February 1903, in the presence of his family.

== Writings as "Owen Meredith" ==
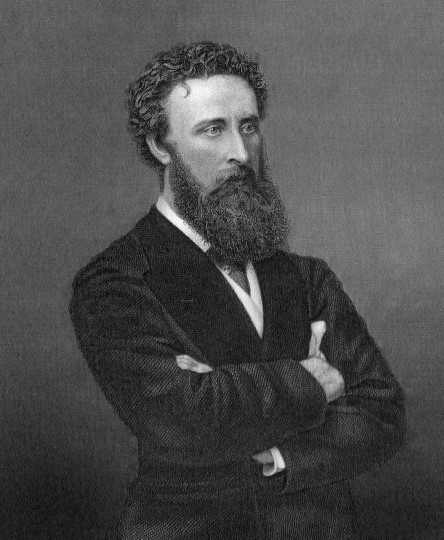
The Right Honourable The Lord Lytton

When Lytton was twenty-five years old, he published in London a volume of poems under the name of Owen Meredith. He went on to publish several other volumes under the same name. The most popular is Lucile, a story in verse published in 1860. His poetry was extremely popular and critically commended in his own day. He was a great experimenter with form. His best work is beautiful, and much of it is of a melancholy nature, as this short extract from a poem called "A Soul's Loss" shows, where the poet bids farewell to a lover who has betrayed him:

Child, I have no lips to chide thee.
Take the blessing of a heart
(Never more to beat beside thee!)
Which in blessing breaks. Depart.
Farewell! I that deified thee
Dare not question what thou art.

Lytton underesteemed his poetic ability: in his Chronicles and Characters (1868), the poor response to which distressed him, Lytton states, 'Talk not of genius baffled. Genius is master of man./Genius does what it must, and Talent does what it can'. However, Lytton's poetic ability was highly esteemed by other literary personalities of the day, and Oscar Wilde dedicated his play Lady Windermere's Fan to him. Lytton is credited with the maxim, 'If you want a new idea, read an old book.'

Lytton's publications included:

- Clytemnestra, The Earl's Return, The Artist and Other Poems (1855)
- The Wanderer (1859), a Byron-esque lyric of Continental adventures that was popular on its release
- Lucile (1860). Lytton was accused of plagiarizing George Sand's novel Lavinia for the story.
- Serbski Pesme (1861). Plagiarized from a French translation of Serbian poems.
- The Ring of Ainasis (1863)
- Fables in Song (1874)
- Speeches of Edward Lord Lytton with some of his Political Writings, Hitherto unpublished, and a Prefactory Memoir by His Son (1874)
- The Life Letters and Literary Remains of Edward Bulwer, Lord Lytton (1883)
- Glenaveril (1885)
- After Paradise, or Legends of Exile (1887)
- King Poppy: A Story Without End (partially composed in early 1870s: only first published in 1892), an allegorical romance in blank verse that was Lytton's favourite of his verse romances

Based on the French translation, in 1868 he published a drama titled Orval, or the Fool of Time which has been inspired by Krasiński's The Undivine Comedy to the point it has been discussed in scholarly literature as an example of a "rough translation", paraphrase or even plagiarism.

== Marriage and children ==
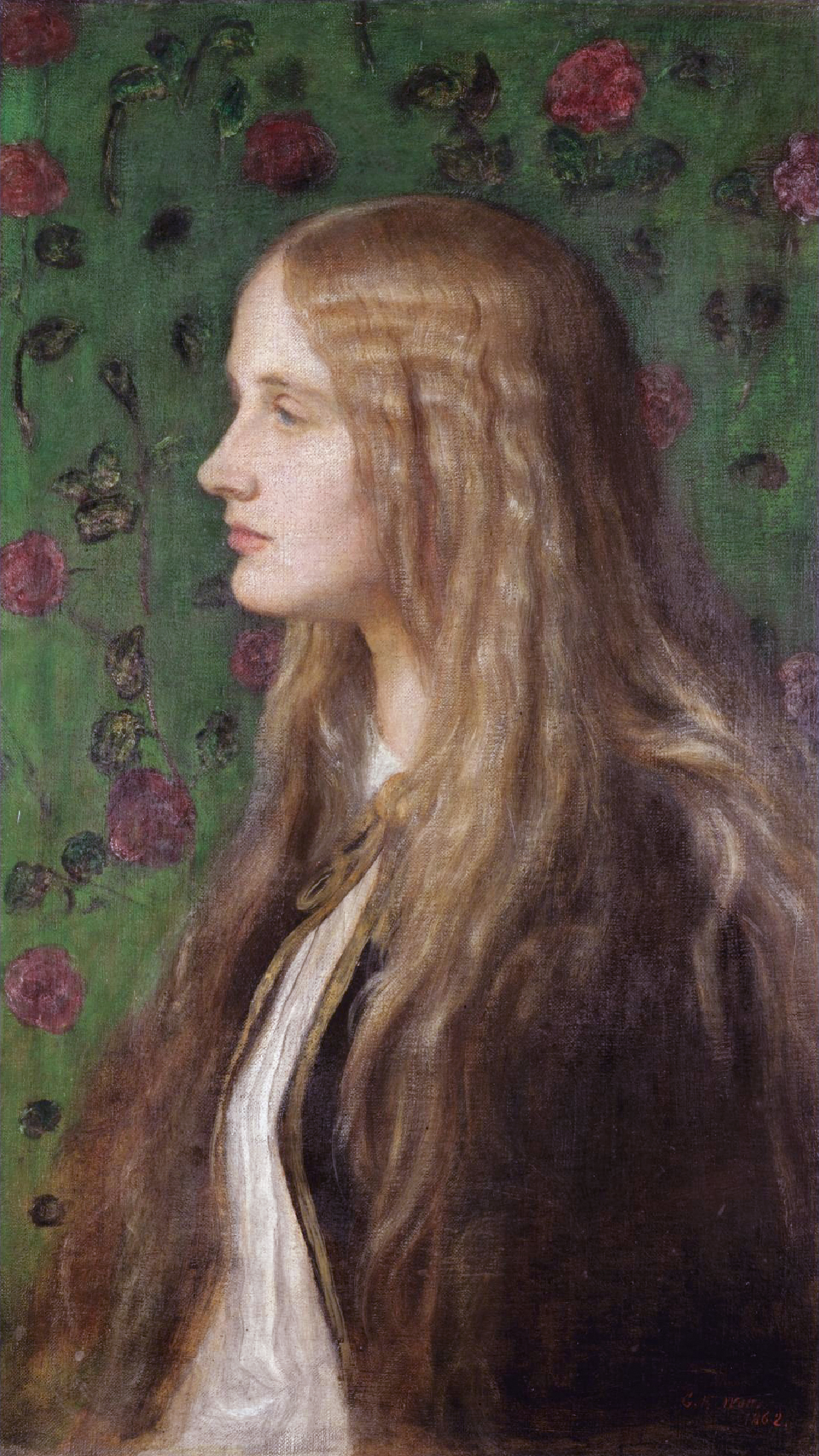
Edith Villiers, Countess of Lytton

On 4 October 1864 Lytton married Edith Villiers. She was the daughter of Edward Ernest Villiers (1806–1843) and Elizabeth Charlotte Liddell and the granddaughter of George Villiers.

They had at least seven children:

- Edward Rowland John Bulwer-Lytton (1865–1871)
- Lady Elizabeth Edith "Betty" Bulwer-Lytton (1867–1942). Married Gerald Balfour, 2nd Earl of Balfour, brother of Prime Minister Arthur Balfour.
- Lady Constance Bulwer-Lytton (1869–1923)
- Hon. Henry Meredith Edward Bulwer-Lytton (1872–1874)
- Lady Emily Bulwer-Lytton (1874–1964). Married Edwin Lutyens. Associate of Krishnamurti.
- Victor Bulwer-Lytton, 2nd Earl of Lytton (1876–1947)
- Neville Bulwer-Lytton, 3rd Earl of Lytton (1879–1951)

Government offices
Preceded by The Lord Northbrook	Viceroy of India; 1876–1880	Succeeded by The Marquess of Ripon
Diplomatic posts
Preceded by The Viscount Lyons	British Ambassador to France; 1887–1891	Succeeded by The Marquess of Dufferin and Ava
Academic offices
Preceded by Edmund Law Lushington	Rector of the University of Glasgow; 1887–1890	Succeeded by Arthur Balfour
Peerage of the United Kingdom
New creation	Earl of Lytton; 1880–1891	Succeeded by Victor Bulwer-Lytton
Preceded by Edward Bulwer-Lytton	Baron Lytton; 1873–1891	Succeeded by Victor Bulwer-Lytton
Baronetage of the United Kingdom
Preceded by Edward Bulwer-Lytton	Baronet of Knebworth; 1873–1891	Succeeded by Victor Bulwer-Lytton
