= Noel Lytton, 4th Earl of Lytton =

British horse keeper and writer (1900–1985)

Lieutenant-Colonel The Right Honourable The Earl of Lytton OBE
- Lytton in 1924

Member of the House of Lords
- Lord Temporal
- In office 9 February 1951 – 18 January 1985
- Preceded by: The 3rd Earl of Lytton
- Succeeded by: The 5th Earl of Lytton

Personal details
- Born: Noel Anthony Scawen Bulwer-Lytton; 7 April 1900 Chelsea, London
- Died: 18 January 1985 (aged 84) Crawley, Sussex
- Spouse: Clarissa Mary Palmer (m. 1946)
- Children: 5
- Parent(s): Neville Bulwer-Lytton, 3rd Earl of Lytton; Judith Blunt-Lytton, 16th Baroness Wentworth
- Education: Royal Military College, Sandhurst
- Other titles: 17th Baron Wentworth; 5th Baron Lytton; 5th Baronet (of Knebworth)

Military service
- Allegiance: United Kingdom
- Branch/service: British Army
- Years of service: 1939–1945
- Rank: Lieutenant-Colonel
- Unit: Rifle Brigade
- Battles/wars: World War II

Lieutenant-Colonel Noel Anthony Scawen Lytton, 4th Earl of Lytton, OBE (7 April 1900 – 18 January 1985), was a British Army officer, Arabian horse fancier (of the Crabbet Arabian Stud) and writer.

== Early life ==
Lytton was born in 1900, the son of Neville Bulwer-Lytton, 3rd Earl of Lytton, and his wife, Judith Blunt-Lytton, 16th Baroness Wentworth, who later divorced. He was a descendant of the poet and adventurer Lord Byron (1788–1824), via his daughter Ada Lovelace (1815–1852), arguably the world's first computer programmer. Her daughter Anne Blunt (1837–1917) was Noel's maternal grandmother. He wrote a memoir of her husband, his grandfather, Wilfrid Scawen Blunt. He was also a great-grandson of the author and politician Edward Bulwer-Lytton.

In 1925, Lytton and his sister Anne changed their surname to Lytton-Milbanke by deed poll, in honour of Noel's mother's succession to the Wentworth barony, which could pass to either of them. They both later went back to Lytton (and not Bulwer-Lytton).

Lytton was raised just east of the Sussex town of Crawley, in the mansion built by his maternal grandparents on the grounds of their renowned horse breeding establishment, the Crabbet Arabian Stud. He was educated at Downside School and at the Royal Military College, Sandhurst, and was commissioned in the Rifle Brigade. He later taught economics there in the 1930s.

== Career ==
In the time between the World Wars, he served "as an administrator and keeper of the peace in the area around Lake Rudolph in Kenya".

When the British entered the Second World War, he was posted by the military to North Africa and Italy, but due to an automobile accident was invalided out to desk duty, which his son describes as extremely frustrating for someone who was used to being athletic and active. He served as administrator of the Patras District from 1944 to 1945. He was appointed an Officer of the Order of the British Empire for his service in 1945.

As part of government administration, Lytton eventually went to Yugoslavia to work with Josip Broz Tito's Partisans.

=== Later life ===
He farmed and wrote books, including a biography about his maternal grandfather and a military autobiography The Desert and the Green. Due to his family's continued interest in the Arabian horse breed, he contributed from his private collection to the W. K. Kellogg Arabian Horse Library at Cal Poly Pomona.

== Marriage and children ==
While in Yugoslavia, Lytton met Clarissa Palmer (1915-2006), a daughter of brigadier general Cyril Eustace Palmer. They married on 30 November 1946 and had five children:

- Lady Caroline Mary Noel Lytton (29 December 1947 – 22 August 2017), a silversmith.
- John Peter Michael Scawen Lytton, 5th Earl of Lytton (born 7 June 1950), married Ursula Komoly, a daughter of Anton Komoloy of Vienna, in 1985. They have three children.
- Hon. Thomas Roland Cyril Lawrence Lytton (born 10 August 1954)
- Lady Lucy Mary Frances Lytton (born 29 January 1957)
- Lady Sarah Teresa Mary Lytton (born 15 October 1959), married P. David Nash Solly in 1984. They have 2 children:
  - Isabelle Kate Solly (born 1992)
  - Benedict Edward Solly (1995–2024)

Noel Lytton succeeded his father as Earl of Lytton in 1951, and his mother as Baron Wentworth in 1957. Both titles passed to his eldest son upon his death in 1985.

== Bibliography ==
- The Desert and the Green (1957)
- Wilfrid Scawen Blunt: A Memoir (1961)
- Mickla Bendore (1962)
- Lucia in Taormina (1963)
- The Stolen Desert (1966)

Peerage of the United Kingdom
| Preceded by Neville Bulwer-Lytton | Earl of Lytton; 1951–1985; Member of the House of Lords (1951–1985) | Succeeded by John Lytton |
| Preceded by Neville Bulwer-Lytton | Baron Lytton; 1951–1985 | Succeeded by John Lytton |
Peerage of England
| Preceded by Judith Blunt-Lytton | Baron Wentworth; 1957–1985 | Succeeded by John Lytton |
Baronetage of the United Kingdom
| Preceded by Neville Bulwer-Lytton | Lytton baronets of Knebworth; 1951–1985 | Succeeded by John Lytton |
