= Newbuildings Place =

Listed house in West Sussex

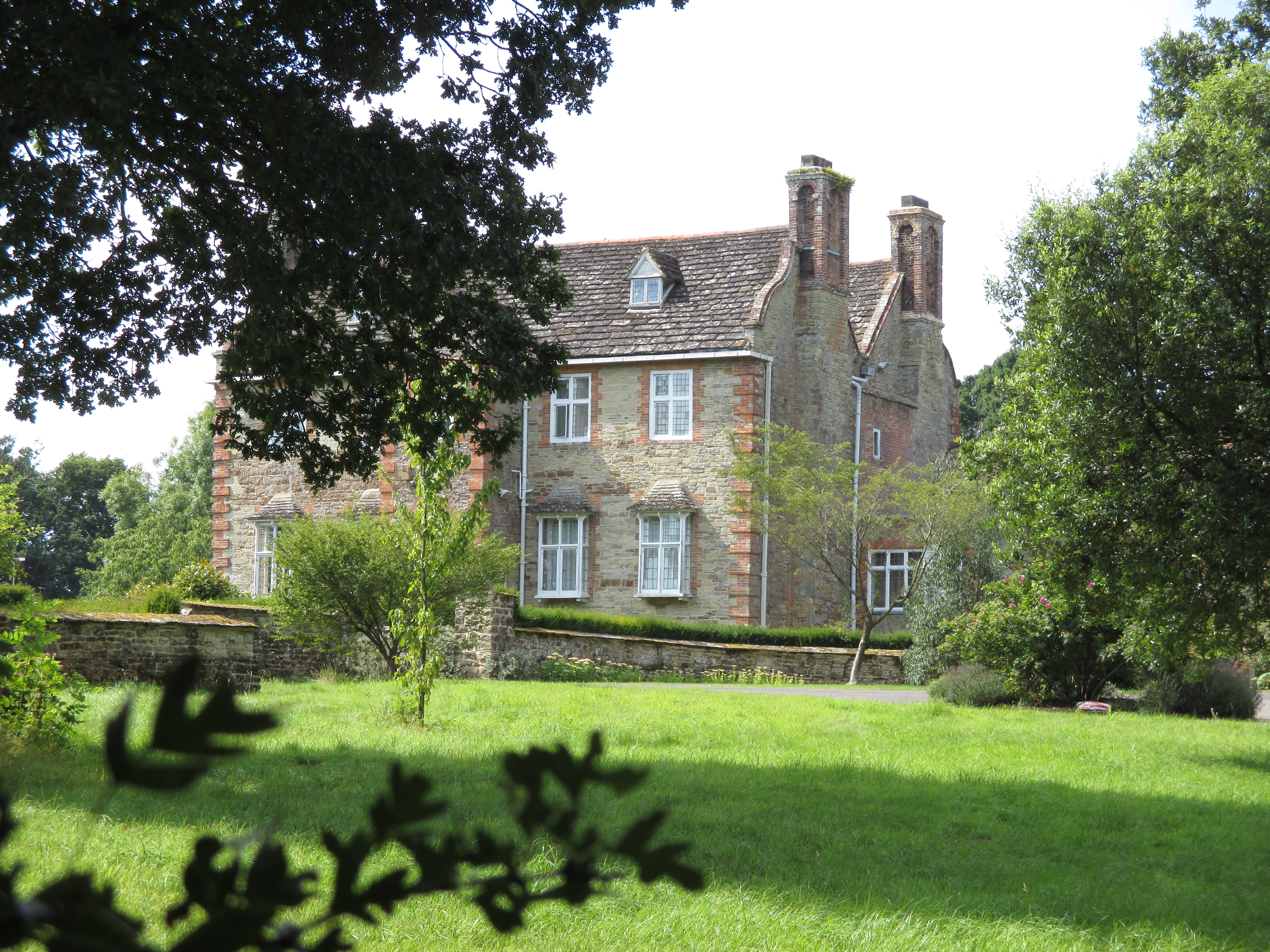
- Newbuildings Place in 2016
- Interactive map of the Newbuildings Place area

General information
- Status: Completed
- Type: House
- Architectural style: Artisan Mannerism
- Classification: Grade I
- Location: Shipley, West Sussex
- Coordinates: 51°0′30″N 0°22′32″W
- Completed: c. 1683
- Owner: John Lytton, 5th Earl of Lytton

Technical details
- Material: Stone

Newbuildings Place is a 17th-century Artisan Mannerist house near Shipley, West Sussex. The house was a home of Wilfrid Scawen Blunt, who was buried in the grounds of the house. The building is currently owned by John Lytton, 5th Earl of Lytton, and is Grade I listed.

== History ==
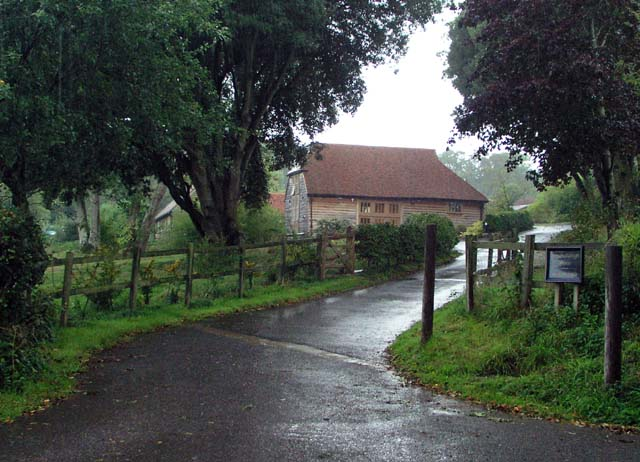
Barn in the grounds of Newbuildings Place

Newbuildings Place was built by Philip Caryll in the 17th century, around 1683. Caryll's family owned the estate for over 100 years. The house was built with numerous priest holes, as the Caryll family were Roman Catholic. It is situated around 1.5 miles (2.4 km) from the church in Shipley, West Sussex.

In the 1820s and 1830s, paupers were housed at Newbuildings Place. In 1833, some of the paupers damaged the house by using its wood panelling for firewood.

The building is a former home of Wilfrid Scawen Blunt, an author, poet and Arabian horse breeder. Blunt originally lived in the house from 1870 to 1872, during which time he added oak to the house's porch and panelling. He moved back into Newbuildings Place in 1906, after his separation from Lady Anne Blunt. Whilst living there, he bought tapestries and furniture from William Morris, which still survive in the house. Blunt is buried in a tomb in the house's grounds; in his will, he requested to be buried in the house's woods in his travelling carpet rather than in a coffin.

After his death, Blunt's daughter, Judith Blunt-Lytton, 16th Baroness Wentworth, owned the house. It was later owned by John Lytton, 5th Earl of Lytton.

In 1959, the house became a Grade I listed building.

The grounds of the house contain a Grade II listed barn, and a Grade II listed dovecote.

== Architecture ==
Newbuildings Place is built in the Artisan Mannerist style, with some interior features matching the Jacobean style. The style of the building is unusual for houses in Sussex, whereas it is more common in Kent and Surrey. The house is built of stone, including Horsham Stone, and has two storeys. The kitchen and cellar are original to the house. The façades of the house contain two gables. The roof of the building is made of Horsham stone slab.
