= Hugh Lytton =

Canadian psychologist

- Born: September 26, 1921
- Died: April 16, 2002 (aged 80)
- Education: University of London; University of Liverpool
- Spouse: Yes
- Children: 2 children, 5 grandchildren
- Scientific career
- Fields: Developmental psychology Educational psychology
- Institutions: University of Calgary
- Thesis: A study of certain factors relevant to the effectiveness of remedial education (1966)

Hugh Lytton (September 26, 1921 – April 16, 2002) was a Canadian psychologist who specialized in developmental and educational psychology. He earned his Ph.D. in psychology from the University of London in 1966. In 1969, he became an associate professor in the Department of Educational Psychology at the University of Calgary. He became a full professor at the University of Calgary in 1973, and continued to hold this position until his retirement in 1988. He was officially named Professor Emeritus of Educational Psychology at the University of Calgary in 1991. He was a fellow of the British Psychological Society and the Canadian Psychological Association, and he became a member of the Society for Research in Child Development in 1970.
