= Baron Cobbold =

Barony in the Peerage of the United Kingdom

Barony of Cobbold
- Sable, a chevron or between in chief two bezants, and in base a lion passant guardant or, on a chief dancetté of the last two ducal coronets azure
- Creation date: 23 November 1960
- Created by: Queen Elizabeth II
- Peerage: Peerage of the United Kingdom
- First holder: Cameron Cobbold
- Present holder: Henry Lytton Cobbold
- Heir apparent: Edward Lytton Cobbold
- Remainder to: 1st Baron's heirs male lawfully begotten
- Seat: Knebworth House
- Motto: Rebus angustis fortis ("Brave in adversity")

Baron Cobbold, of Knebworth in the County of Hertford, is a title in the Peerage of the United Kingdom. It was created in 1960 for the banker Cameron Cobbold. He was Governor of the Bank of England from 1949 to 1961.

The 2nd Baron succeeded in 1987. In 1961, he assumed by deed poll the additional surname of Lytton, which was the maiden name of his mother Lady Hermione Lytton, through whom the family inherited Knebworth House. From 2000 he was one of the ninety elected hereditary peers who remained in the House of Lords after the passing of the House of Lords Act 1999, and sat as a cross-bencher until his retirement in 2014. The 2nd Baron died in May 2022 and was succeeded by his eldest son, the 3rd Baron.

Several other members of the Cobbold family have also gained distinction. The first Baron was the grandson of Nathaniel Fromanteel Cobbold, who was the son of John Cobbold, Member of Parliament for Ipswich, and brother of John Cobbold, Thomas Cobbold and Felix Cobbold, who also sat as Members of Parliament.

== Barons Cobbold (1960) ==
- Cameron Fromanteel Cobbold, 1st Baron Cobbold (1904–1987)
- David Antony Fromanteel Lytton Cobbold, 2nd Baron Cobbold (1937–2022)
- Henry Fromanteel Lytton Cobbold, 3rd Baron Cobbold (born 1962)

The heir apparent is the present holder's son, the Hon. Edward Lytton Cobbold (born 1992)

=== Line of succession ===
- Cameron Fromanteel Cobbold, 1st Baron Cobbold (1904–1987)
  - David Antony Fromanteel Lytton Cobbold, 2nd Baron Cobbold (1937–2022)
    - Henry Fromanteel Lytton Cobbold, 3rd Baron Cobbold (born 1962)
      - (1) Hon. Edward Stucley Fromanteel Lytton Cobbold (born 1992)
        - (2) Hon. Albert Hieronymus Fromanteel Lytton Cobbold (born 2026)
    - (3) Hon. Peter Guy Fromanteel Lytton Cobbold (born 1964)
      - (4) Frederick Alexander Lytton Cobbold (born 1992)
    - (5) Hon. Richard Stucley Fromanteel Lytton Cobbold (born 1968)
      - (6) Sam Arthur Fromanteel Lytton Cobbold (born 1997)
  - (7) Hon. Rowland John Fromanteel Cobbold (born 1944)
    - (8) Patrick Alexander Fromanteel Cobbold (born 1974)

== See also ==
- Earl of Lytton
