= Hermione Cobbold, Baroness Cobbold =

The Right Honourable The Lady Cobbold
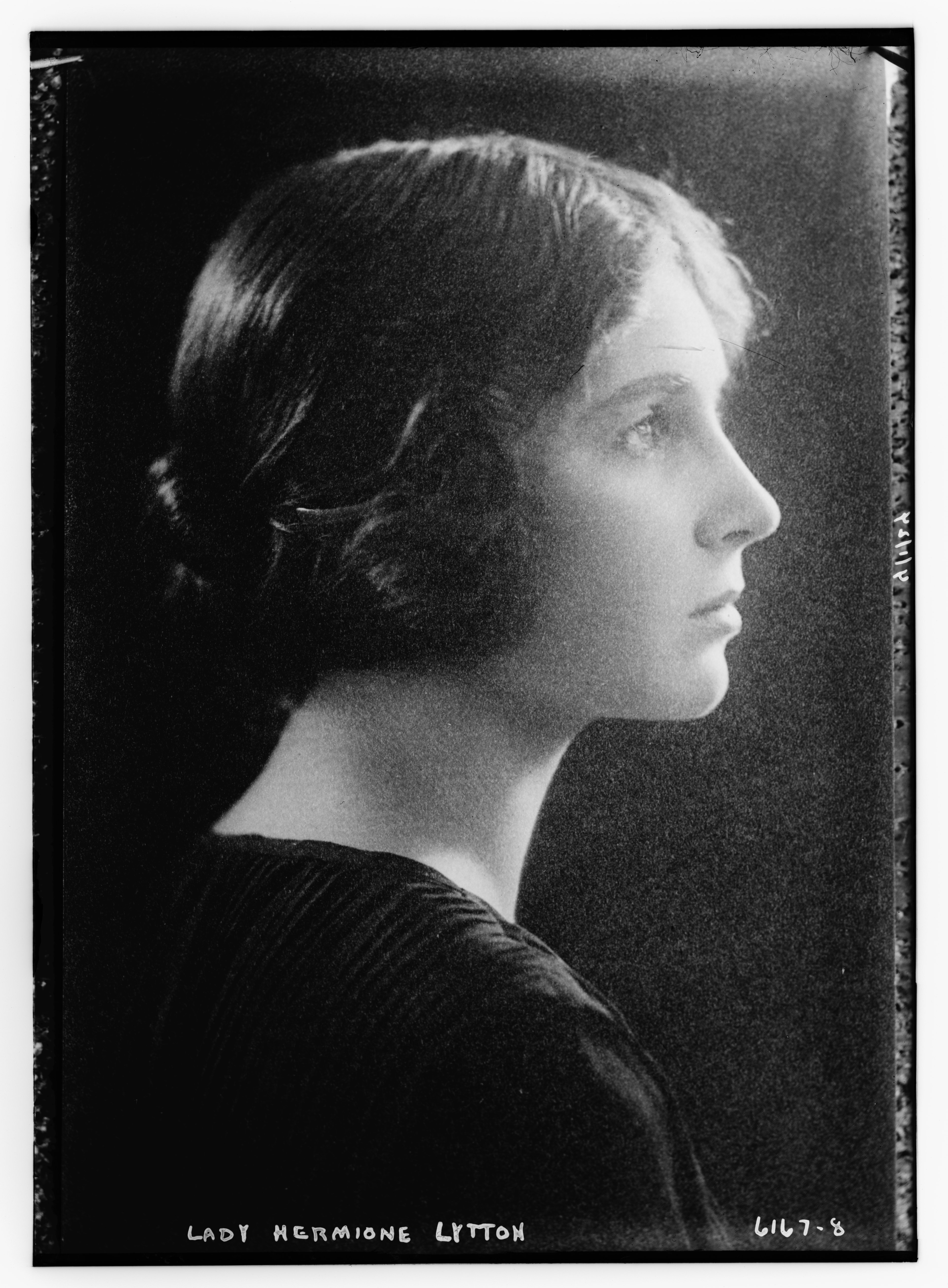
- Hermione Cobbold in 1924
- Born: Margaret Hermione Millicent Bulwer-Lytton; 31 August 1905
- Died: 27 October 2004 (aged 99)
- Spouse: Cameron Fromanteel Cobbold, 1st Baron Cobbold
- Children: 4, including David
- Parent(s): Victor Bulwer-Lytton, 2nd Earl of Lytton; Pamela Chichele-Plowden

Hermione Cobbold, Baroness Cobbold (born Margaret Hermione Millicent Bulwer-Lytton; 31 August 1905 – 27 October 2004), known as Lady Hermione Bulwer-Lytton until 1930, was the British matriarch of Knebworth House and wife of the 1st Baron Cobbold.

She was born in 1905 to the 2nd Earl of Lytton and Pamela Frances Audrey Chichele-Plowden; during her father's tenure as acting Viceroy of India in 1926 she became acting Vicereine as her mother, who would have held that role, was in England.

It was while she was in India that she met and married (in 1930) Cameron Cobbold, the future Baron Cobbold. She inherited Knebworth House following the death of her father in 1947; both her brothers predeceased their father. Hermione Cobbold was an energetic supporter of many charities and local organizations such as the YMCA. She died in Hertfordshire at the age of 99, survived by her daughter and two sons. Her elder daughter had died in 1937.

The historian, Brian Harrison, interviewed Cobbold in September 1976 as part of the Suffrage Interviews project, titled Oral evidence on the suffragette and suffragist movements: the Brian Harrison interviews. Although the interview relates to her Father, Cobbold talks about her early life in London, moving to Knebworth and her education, as well as her time in India.

== Sources ==
- "Obituary: Hermione, Lady Cobbold". The Times. 2 November 2004.
