= Wilfrid Scawen Blunt =

English poet and essayist (1840–1922)

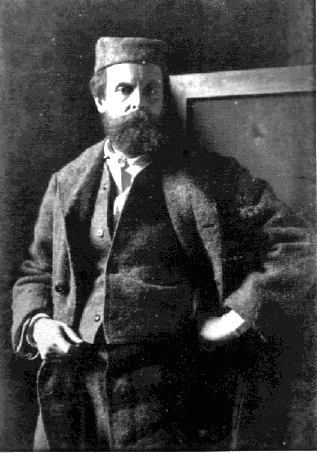
- Wilfrid Scawen Blunt
- Born: 17 August 1840; Petworth, Sussex, England
- Died: 10 September 1922 (aged 82); England
- Occupations: Poet, essayist
- Known for: Poetry, political activist, polemicist, adventurer, Arabian horse breeder
- Spouse: Anne Blunt, 15th Baroness Wentworth (m. 1869; died 1917)
- Children: Judith Blunt-Lytton, 16th Baroness Wentworth

Wilfrid Scawen Blunt (17 August 1840 – 10 September 1922), sometimes spelt Wilfred, was an English poet and writer. He and his wife Lady Anne Blunt travelled in the Middle East and were instrumental in preserving the Arabian horse bloodlines through their farm, the Crabbet Arabian Stud.

Blunt was best known for his poetry, which appeared in a collected edition in 1914, and also wrote political essays and polemics. He became additionally known for strongly anti-imperialist views that were relatively uncommon in his time.

== Early life ==
Blunt was the son of Francis Scawen Blunt, of Crabbet, by his wife Mary Chandler. Blunt was born at Petworth House in Sussex, home of his aunt's husband Baron Leconfield. He served in the Diplomatic Service 1858–1869. He was raised in the faith of his mother, a Catholic convert, and educated at Twyford School, Stonyhurst, and at St Mary's College, Oscott. He was a cousin of Lord Alfred Douglas.

== Biography ==
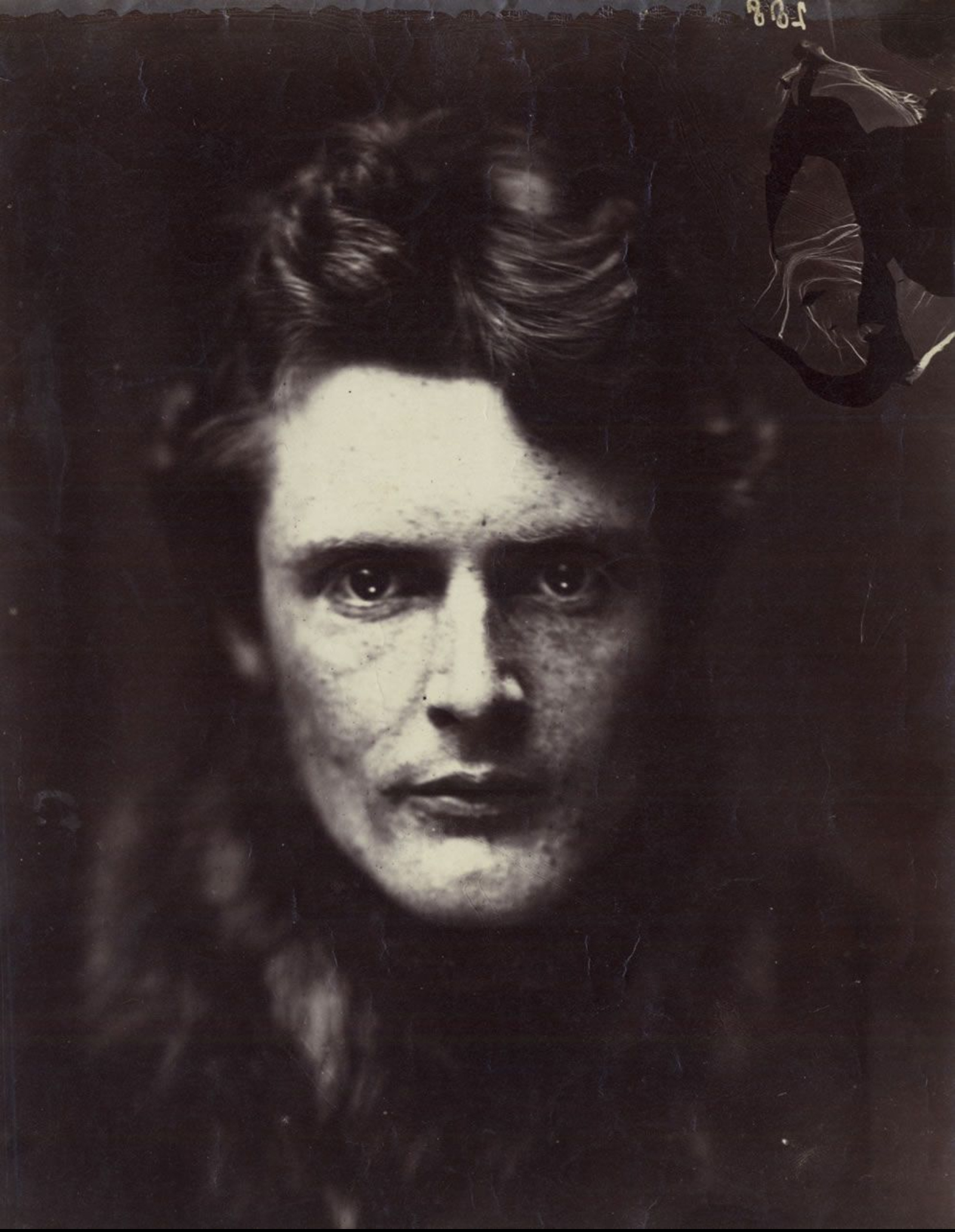
Blunt in his 20s

In 1869 Blunt married Lady Anne Noel, daughter of the Earl of Lovelace and Ada Lovelace, and granddaughter of Lord Byron. Together the Blunts travelled through Spain, Algeria, Egypt, the Syrian Desert, and extensively in the Middle East and India.

=== Horse breeding ===
Based upon pure-blooded Arabian horses they obtained in Egypt and the Nejd, the Blunts co-founded Crabbet Arabian Stud. They later bought a property near Cairo named Sheykh Obeyd as their horse-breeding base in Egypt.

=== Anti-imperialism, beliefs and politics ===
Blunt was generally anti-imperialist as a matter of belief. In 1882, He championed the cause of Urabi Pasha, which led to him being barred from Egypt for four years. Blunt remained vigorously opposed to colonial expansion, writing three books outlining his views: The Secret History of the English Occupation of Egypt... (1907), Gordon at Khartoum (1911), and My Diaries: Being a Personal Narrative of Events, 1888–1914 (2 vols. 1919–1920). Historian Robert O. Collins, who worked closely with British civil servants, described Blunt as "The most vigorous English advocate of Egyptian nationalism" and cautioned against using Blunt's work uncritically.

His support for Irish independence led to imprisonment in 1888 for chairing an anti-eviction meeting in County Galway that had been banned by the Chief Secretary, Arthur Balfour. He was held in Galway Prison, then at Kilmainham Gaol in Dublin.

Blunt's three attempts to enter Parliament were unsuccessful. He stood as a "Tory Democrat" supporting Irish Home Rule at Camberwell North in 1885 and as a Liberal at Kidderminster in 1886, where he lost by 285 votes. While in prison in Ireland, he contested a Deptford by-election in 1888, but lost by 275 votes.

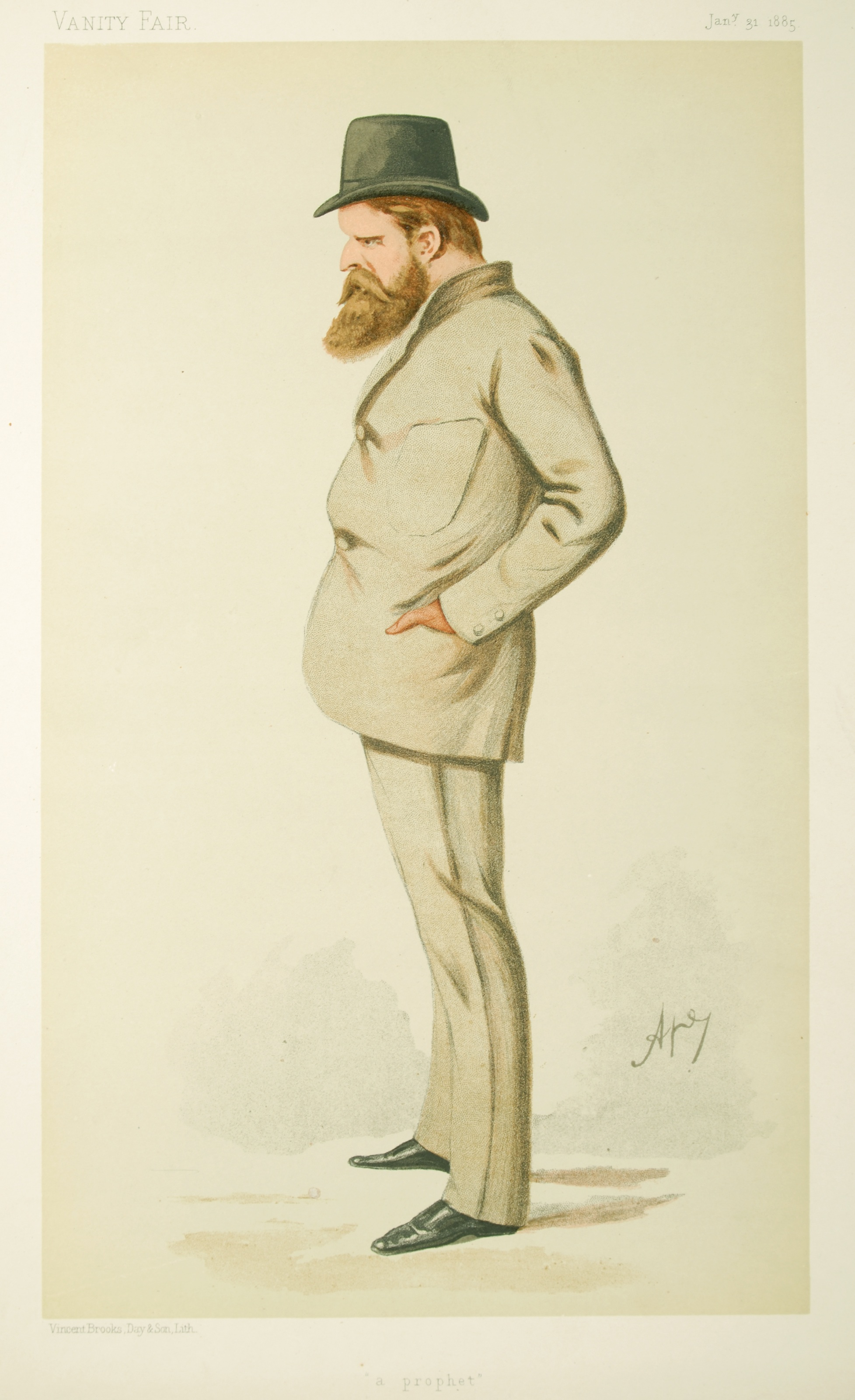
Blunt caricatured by Ape in Vanity Fair, 1885

When describing late 19th and early 20th century Orientalist authors, Edward Said wrote of Blunt: "[he] believed his vision of things Oriental was individual, self-created out of some intensely personal encounter with the Orient, Islam, or the Arabs" and "expressed general contempt for official knowledge held about the East." Notably, Said marked Blunt as exceptional in not exhibiting most other Orientalists' "final...traditional Western hostility to and fear of the Orient."

As an adult Blunt became an atheist, though he underwent episodes of faith. He had a serious interest in Islam and became immersed in its reformist strands. Blunt had supposedly become a convert to Islam under the influence of Jamal al-Din al-Afghani. However, he agreed before he died to see a priest, Fr Vincent McNabb, and receive Communion, so fulfilling a prediction of Sir William Henry Gregory, as recalled by his wife: "You will see Wilfrid will die with the wafer in his mouth."

=== Affairs and separation ===
Wilfrid and Lady Anne's only child to reach maturity was Judith Blunt-Lytton, 16th Baroness Wentworth, later known as Lady Wentworth. She was married in Cairo when she was an adult, but in 1904 she relocated permanently to the Crabbet Park Estate.

Wilfrid had mistresses, including long-term relations with Catherine "Skittles" Walters, and Jane Morris, the wife of his friend William Morris. He seduced and impregnated his cousin Mary Wyndham, having previously been the lover of her mother.

After he moved another mistress, Dorothy Carleton, into his home, Lady Anne legally separated from him in 1906. She signed a Deed of Partition drawn up by Wilfrid, under terms unfavourable to herself, whereby she kept the Crabbet Park property, where their daughter Judith lived, and half the horses, while Blunt took Caxtons Farm, also known as Newbuildings, and the rest of the stock.

Struggling with financial concerns and addiction, Wilfrid sold off numerous horses to pay debts and constantly attempted to obtain additional assets. Lady Anne left the management of her properties to Judith and spent many months of each year in Egypt at the Sheykh Obeyd estate, moving there permanently in 1915.

Wilfrid tried to disinherit Judith and obtain the entire Crabbet property for himself. As a result, on her death in 1917, Lady Anne passed her share of the Crabbet Stud to Judith's daughters, under the oversight of an independent trustee. Blunt filed a lawsuit soon afterwards.

Ownership of the Arabian horses went back and forth between the estates of father and daughter in subsequent years. Blunt sold more horses to pay off debts and shot at least four in an attempt to spite his daughter, which led to intervention of the trustee of the estate with a court injunction to prevent him from further "dissipating the assets" of the estate. The suit was settled in favour of the granddaughters in 1920 and Judith bought their share from the trustee, combining it with her own and reuniting the stud.

Wilfrid and Judith were briefly reconciled before his death in 1922, but his promise to rewrite his will to restore Judith's inheritance was not kept.

Blunt was a friend of Winston Churchill, aiding him in a 1906 biography of his father, Lord Randolph Churchill. Blunt had befriended him in 1883 at a chess tournament.

=== Poet ===
More direct, conversational and wry than typical ornate Victorian verse, Blunt's poetry can be seen as transitional between late Victorian romanticism and the psychological realism of the 20th century poetry. His work reflects the many romances, his political views and his travels. His mistress Skittles, for instance, was portrayed as Esther in his Sonnets and Songs by Proteus (1875), which experiment with the sonnet form. The Wind and the Whirlwind (1883) is a long poem condemning the British intervention in Egypt of 1882. Blunt's most memorable line of poetry on the subject of anti-imperialism comes from Satan Absolved (1899), where the devil, answering a Kiplingesque remark by God, snaps back:

The white man's burden, Lord, is the burden of his cash.

Elizabeth Longford wrote, "Blunt stood Rudyard Kipling's familiar concept on its head, arguing that the imperialists' burden is not their moral responsibility for the colonised peoples, but their urge to make money out of them." His prison sonnet sequence In vinculis ("In chains", 1888) marks a turning point in his writing. His friend Oscar Wilde said that his imprisonment in Galway Prison changed Blunt "from a clever rhymer into a deep-thinking poet". The Stealing of the Mare (1892) is a rendering in verse of Lady Anne Blunt's translation of the ancient Arabic tale.

By the end of his life Blunt was a respected literary figure, friendly with Hilaire Belloc (a neighbour), Roger Casement, St John Philby (father of Kim), Alice and Wilfrid Meynell, Francis Thompson and Father Vincent McNabb. He was also highly regarded by the younger generation of poets, as seen by a tribute dinner held in January 1914 at Blunt's manor house in West Sussex. Six poets travelled from London to attend: W. B. Yeats, Ezra Pound, the imagists Richard Aldington and Frank Stuart Flint, and the older poets Victor Plarr and Thomas Sturge Moore. Pound later called Blunt "the last of the great Victorians".

== Bibliography ==
- Sonnets and Songs. By Proteus. John Murray, 1875
- Aubrey de Vere (ed.): Proteus and Amadeus: A Correspondence Kegan Paul, 1878
- The Love Sonnets of Proteus. Kegan Paul, 1881
- The Future of Islam Kegan Paul, Trench, London 1882 (scanned)
- The Wind and the Whirlwind (1883)
- In Vinculis (1889)
- A New Pilgrimage and Other Poems (1889)
- Esther (1892)
- The Stealing of the Mare (1892)
- Griselda Kegan Paul, Trench, Trübner, 1893
- The Quatrains of Youth (1898)
- The Poetry of Wilfrid Blunt (1898), selected by W.E. Henley and George Wyndham.
- Satan Absolved: A Victorian Mystery. J. Lane, London 1899
- Seven Golden Odes of Pagan Arabia, (The Moallakat) 1903
- Atrocities of Justice under the English Rule in Egypt T. F. Unwin, London, 1907
- Secret History of the English Occupation of Egypt Knopf, 1907
- India under Ripon; A Private Diary T. Fisher Unwin, London 1909
- Gordon at Khartoum. S. Swift, London 1911 (scanned)
- The Land War in Ireland. S. Swift, London 1912
- The Poetical Works. 2 vols. . Macmillan, London 1914 (Volume 1 Volume 2)
- My Diaries: Being a Personal Narrative of Events, 1888–1914. Secker, London 1919–1921; 2 vols. Knopf, New York 1921 (Part 1 Part 2)
- Poems. Knopf, New York 1923; Macmillan, London 1923.

== References and further reading ==
- Elizabeth Longford (1979). A Pilgrimage of Passion: The Life of Wilfrid Scawen Blunt. London: Weidenfeld & Nicolson
- Max Egremont (1977). The Cousins: The Friendship, Opinions and Activities of Wilfrid Scawen Blunt and George Wyndham. London: Collins
- Luisa Villa, "A 'Political Education': Wilfrid Scawen Blunt, the Arabs and the Egyptian Revolution (1881–82)", Journal of Victorian Culture 17.1 (2012): 46–63
- Edmund King GC., "Radicalism in the Margins: The Politics of Reading Wilfrid Scawen Blunt in 1920." Journal of British Studies 55.3 (2016): 501–518 online
- Frank C. Sharp and Jan Marsh (2012), The Collected Letters of Jane Morris, Boydell & Brewer, London
- Judith Anne Dorothea Blunt-Lytton, 16th Baroness Wentworth (1979), The Authentic Arabian Horse, 3rd ed., London: George Allen & Unwin
- The Earl of Lytton (1961), Wilfrid Scawen Blunt. A Memoir by his Grandson, London: Macdonald
- "Wilfrid Scawen Blunt". Archived from the original on 16 March 2009. includes some poems
- "Sonnets by Wilfrid Scawen Blunt".
- "Arab Pen, English Purse: John Sabunji and Wilfrid Scawen Blunt". Archived from the original on 28 December 2010. Blunt's political activities in the Middle East, by Martin Kramer
- Lucy McDiarmid (2014) Poets and the Peacock Dinner, Oxford University Press
