= Grade II* listed buildings in North Hertfordshire =

There are over 20,000 Grade II* listed buildings in England. This page is a list of these buildings in the district of North Hertfordshire in Hertfordshire.

== North Hertfordshire ==
Name	Location	Type	Completed (Note: The date given is the date used by Historic England as significant for the initial building or that of an important part in the structure's description.)	Date designated	Grid ref. (Note: Sometimes known as OSGB36, the grid reference is based on the British national grid reference system used by the Ordnance Survey.) Geo-coordinates	Entry number (Note: The "List Entry Number" is a unique number assigned to each listed building and scheduled monument by Historic England.)	Image
Bear House	Ashwell, North Hertfordshire	Farmhouse	Late 15th century	27 May 1968	TL2663639607; 52°02′25″N 0°09′18″W	1347312	Bear House More images
Bluegates Farmhouse	Ashwell End, Ashwell, North Hertfordshire	Farmhouse	Mid 16th century	9 June 1952	TL2561440588; 52°02′58″N 0°10′11″W	1174817	Bluegates Farmhouse
Ducklake	Ashwell, North Hertfordshire	House	c. 1600	9 June 1952	TL2692639911; 52°02′35″N 0°09′03″W	1102721	Ducklake More images
Forresters Cottage	Ashwell, North Hertfordshire	House	Late C15/Early 15th century	27 May 1968	TL2688039714; 52°02′29″N 0°09′05″W	1174915	Forresters Cottage More images
Jessamine House	Ashwell, North Hertfordshire	House	c. 1700	27 May 1968	TL2695739708; 52°02′28″N 0°09′01″W	1102750	Upload Photo
Rose and Crown Public House	Ashwell, North Hertfordshire	Cross Passage House	Late C15/Early 16th century	9 June 1952	TL2668439620; 52°02′26″N 0°09′16″W	1102708	Rose and Crown Public House More images
Town House (Ashwell Museum)	Ashwell, North Hertfordshire	House	c. 1500	19 November 1984	TL2668739681; 52°02′28″N 0°09′16″W	1102724	Town House (Ashwell Museum) More images
57 and 59 High Street	Ashwell, North Hertfordshire	House	c. 1500	27 May 1968	TL2673539644; 52°02′27″N 0°09′13″W	1347311	57 and 59 High Street
Butterfield House	Baldock	Rectory	1870-73	15 August 1974	TL2437733859; 51°59′21″N 0°11′24″W	1102078	Butterfield House
Cokenach House including the Wing	Cokenach, Barkway, North Hertfordshire	Country House	c. 1570	27 May 1968	TL3956236146; 52°00′22″N 0°01′55″E	1102628	Upload Photo
The Gables	Barkway, North Hertfordshire	House	17th century	27 May 1968	TL3845035531; 52°00′03″N 0°00′55″E	1102596	Upload Photo
2 High Street	Barkway, North Hertfordshire	House	Late 16th century	24 July 1973	TL3846635930; 52°00′16″N 0°00′57″E	1102599	Upload Photo
93/95 and 97 High Street	Barkway, North Hertfordshire	House	c. 1600	27 May 1968	TL3838435301; 51°59′56″N 0°00′52″E	1174330	93/95 and 97 High Street More images
Church of St Margaret of Antioch	Barley, North Hertfordshire	Parish Church	12th century	27 May 1968	TL4016638418; 52°01′35″N 0°02′30″E	1102577	Church of St Margaret of Antioch More images
Hill House	Barley, North Hertfordshire	House	1907	3 June 1987	TL3992339021; 52°01′55″N 0°02′18″E	1102568	Upload Photo
The Town House	Barley, North Hertfordshire	Church House	Early 16th century	9 June 1952	TL4013438441; 52°01′36″N 0°02′28″E	1347403	The Town House More images
Church of St Margaret of Antioch	Bygrave, North Hertfordshire	Parish Church	12th century	27 May 1968	TL2660336134; 52°00′33″N 0°09′25″W	1175479	Church of St Margaret of Antioch More images
Church of St Mary Magdalene	Caldecote, North Hertfordshire	Church	C14-15	27 May 1968	TL2365438429; 52°01′50″N 0°11′56″W	1347341	Church of St Mary Magdalene More images
Church of St Mary	Clothall, North Hertfordshire	Parish Church	12th century	27 May 1968	TL2709832025; 51°58′20″N 0°09′04″W	1175746	Church of St Mary More images
Parish Church of St Giles	Codicote, North Hertfordshire	Parish Church	12th century	27 May 1968	TL2185218730; 51°51′14″N 0°13′56″W	1102834	Parish Church of St Giles More images
The Bury	Codicote, North Hertfordshire	House	Soon after 1659	9 June 1952	TL2188018541; 51°51′08″N 0°13′55″W	1347253	Upload Photo
Ruins of Church of St Etheldrada	Graveley, North Hertfordshire	Church ruin	13th century or early 14th century	9 June 1952	TL2473227932; 51°56′09″N 0°11′13″W	1102564	Ruins of Church of St Etheldrada More images
The Grange	Graveley, North Hertfordshire	House	Mid 18th century	27 May 1968	TL2308627895; 51°56′09″N 0°12′40″W	1175053	The Grange More images
Church of St Faith	Hexton, North Hertfordshire	Parish Church	Mid 13th century	27 May 1968	TL1038430358; 51°57′39″N 0°23′42″W	1347066	Church of St Faith More images
Church of St Nicholas	Hinxworth, North Hertfordshire	Parish Church	14th century	27 May 1968	TL2373440347; 52°02′52″N 0°11′50″W	1347342	Church of St Nicholas More images
Hinxworth Place	Hinxworth, North Hertfordshire	House	1980	19 November 1984	TL2388339597; 52°02′27″N 0°11′43″W	1347346	Hinxworth Place More images
Old Ramerick Manor	Ickleford, North Hertfordshire	Farmhouse	1625	9 June 1952	TL1717535009; 52°00′04″N 0°17′40″W	1174339	Upload Photo
Church of St Faith	Kelshall, North Hertfordshire	Parish Church	Early 15th century	27 May 1968	TL3286536216; 52°00′31″N 0°03′56″W	1102650	Church of St Faith More images
The Old Homestead	Breachwood Green, King's Walden, North Hertfordshire	House	Early 17th century	21 May 1979	TL1501221910; 51°53′02″N 0°19′49″W	1176170	Upload Photo
Church of St Martin	Knebworth, North Hertfordshire	Parish Church	1914	27 May 1968	TL2529320095; 51°51′55″N 0°10′54″W	1174371	Church of St Martin More images
Homewood	Knebworth, North Hertfordshire	House	1900	2 May 1973	TL2386519842; 51°51′48″N 0°12′09″W	1102736	Homewood More images
Knebworth House	Old Knebworth, Knebworth, North Hertfordshire	Country House	1492	9 June 1952	TL2299720868; 51°52′22″N 0°12′53″W	1102767	Knebworth House More images
Dyes Farmhouse	Langley, North Hertfordshire	Farmhouse	Early 17th century	8 February 1988	TL2178123258; 51°53′40″N 0°13′54″W	1176520	Upload Photo
Arunside	Letchworth Garden City, North Hertfordshire	House	1904-5	7 September 1979	TL2165431435; 51°58′05″N 0°13′50″W	1101993	Upload Photo
Church of All Saints	Willian, Letchworth Garden City, North Hertfordshire	Parish Church	12th century	27 May 1954	TL2246330657; 51°57′39″N 0°13′09″W	1174914	Church of All Saints More images
Letchworth Hall Hotel	Letchworth Garden City, North Hertfordshire	House	Early 17th century	27 May 1954	TL2173830819; 51°57′45″N 0°13′46″W	1174314	Letchworth Hall Hotel More images
North Hertfordshire Masonic Centre (the Cloisters)	Letchworth Garden City, North Hertfordshire	Fountain	1906-7	7 September 1979	TL2204331427; 51°58′05″N 0°13′30″W	1102019	North Hertfordshire Masonic Centre (the Cloisters) More images
Puncharden Hall	Willian, Letchworth Garden City, North Hertfordshire	House	Mid 18th century	27 May 1954	TL2241930736; 51°57′42″N 0°13′11″W	1295498	Upload Photo
Tanglewood	Letchworth Garden City, North Hertfordshire	Timber Framed House	1907	7 September 1979	TL2128931592; 51°58′10″N 0°14′09″W	1295596	Upload Photo
The Old Vicarage	Willian, Letchworth Garden City, North Hertfordshire	House	Modern	27 May 1954	TL2247630712; 51°57′41″N 0°13′08″W	1295503	Upload Photo
The Spirella Company of Great Britain Ltd Building	Letchworth Garden City, North Hertfordshire	Factory	1912	7 September 1979	TL2149632793; 51°58′49″N 0°13′57″W	1347670	The Spirella Company of Great Britain Ltd Building More images
296 Norton Way South	Letchworth Garden City, North Hertfordshire	Drawing Office	1906-7	7 September 1979	TL2212632389; 51°58′36″N 0°13′24″W	1102002	296 Norton Way South More images
102 Wilbury Road	Letchworth Garden City, North Hertfordshire	House	1908	14 January 1977	TL2130533674; 51°59′18″N 0°14′06″W	1102820	Upload Photo
158 Wilbury Road	Letchworth Garden City, North Hertfordshire	House	1905	7 September 1979	TL2187333701; 51°59′18″N 0°13′36″W	1174901	Upload Photo
Church of St Peter	Lilley, North Hertfordshire	Parish Church	1870-72	27 May 1968	TL1183226370; 51°55′29″N 0°22′30″W	1174639	Church of St Peter More images
Church of St Vincent	Newnham, North Hertfordshire	Parish Church	12th century	27 May 1968	TL2433437637; 52°01′24″N 0°11′22″W	1347335	Church of St Vincent More images
Court House	Great Offley, Offley, North Hertfordshire	House	Early 17th century	9 June 1952	TL1434427014; 51°55′48″N 0°20′18″W	1347082	Upload Photo
Little Offley	Little Offley, Offley, North Hertfordshire	Country House	Late 16th century	9 June 1952	TL1296228502; 51°56′37″N 0°21′29″W	1175061	Little Offley More images
Farm Building at Entrance to Yard at Hammond's Farm	Pirton, North Hertfordshire	Farm Building	16th century or earlier	24 October 1988	TL1442132296; 51°58′38″N 0°20′08″W	1295388	Upload Photo
Pirton Grange	Apsley End, Pirton, North Hertfordshire	House	16th century	9 June 1952	TL1226832932; 51°59′01″N 0°22′00″W	1175572	Upload Photo
Gatehouse at Pirton Grange	Apsley End, Pirton, North Hertfordshire	Bridge	16th century or early 17th century	27 May 1968	TL1228532944; 51°59′01″N 0°21′59″W	1175594	Upload Photo
Hammond's Farmhouse	Pirton, North Hertfordshire	Farmhouse	Early 16th century	9 June 1952	TL1444332288; 51°58′38″N 0°20′07″W	1175235	Hammond's Farmhouse
The Rectory Farmhouse	Pirton, North Hertfordshire	Farmhouse	Early 17th century	9 June 1952	TL1414831935; 51°58′27″N 0°20′23″W	1103158	Upload Photo
Three Gables	Pirton, North Hertfordshire	House	18th century	24 October 1988	TL1457831498; 51°58′13″N 0°20′01″W	1103185	Three Gables More images
West Barn at Rectory Farm	Pirton, North Hertfordshire	Threshing Barn	15th century or early 16th century	27 May 1968	TL1410731886; 51°58′25″N 0°20′25″W	1175545	Upload Photo
Princess Helena College, Temple Dinsley, with Terraces, Steps, Walls, Railings, Gates, Pergolas, and Garden Buildings	Preston, North Hertfordshire	House	17th century	9 June 1952	TL1821324826; 51°54′34″N 0°16′58″W	1307766	Princess Helena College, Temple Dinsley, with Terraces, Steps, Walls, Railings, Gates, Pergolas, and Garden Buildings More images
Tudor House	Preston, North Hertfordshire	House	Mid 17th century	27 May 1968	TL1905724739; 51°54′31″N 0°16′14″W	1102430	Upload Photo
Church of All Saints	Radwell, North Hertfordshire	Parish Church	Medieval	27 May 1968	TL2323535856; 52°00′27″N 0°12′22″W	1102676	Church of All Saints More images
Royston Manor House	Royston, North Hertfordshire	House	Early 18th century	14 June 1964	TL3566940727; 52°02′54″N 0°01′23″W	1102011	Royston Manor House More images
4 Baldock Street	Royston, North Hertfordshire	House	Early 19th century	11 June 1976	TL3554040692; 52°02′53″N 0°01′30″W	1102056	Upload Photo
59 and 61 High Street	Royston, North Hertfordshire	House	Late 15th century or early 16th century	14 June 1964	TL3565540478; 52°02′46″N 0°01′24″W	1174560	Upload Photo
63 and 65 High Street	Royston, North Hertfordshire	House	Late 15th century or early 16th century	14 June 1964	TL3566140464; 52°02′46″N 0°01′24″W	1102071	Upload Photo
9 Kneesworth Street	Royston, North Hertfordshire	House	15th century	11 June 1976	TL3558940774; 52°02′56″N 0°01′27″W	1102038	9 Kneesworth Street
11 Kneesworth Street	Royston, North Hertfordshire	Palace Guardroom	15th century	11 June 1976	TL3558640782; 52°02′56″N 0°01′27″W	1347678	11 Kneesworth Street
17–21 Kneesworth Street	Royston, North Hertfordshire	Royal Palace	Modern	14 June 1964	TL3557340810; 52°02′57″N 0°01′28″W	1102039	Upload Photo
Church of St Mary	Rushden, North Hertfordshire	Parish Church	Mid 14th century	27 May 1968	TL3054131763; 51°58′08″N 0°06′04″W	1175887	Church of St Mary More images
Julians	Rushden, North Hertfordshire	Country House	c. 1605	9 June 1952	TL3079232548; 51°58′34″N 0°05′50″W	1347370	Julians
Barn about 35m South East of Sandon Bury	Sandon, North Hertfordshire	Barn	Late 17th century	27 May 1968	TL3228934462; 51°59′34″N 0°04′29″W	1102609	Upload Photo
Danyells	Sandon, North Hertfordshire	Farmhouse	c. 1700	27 May 1968	TL3238534210; 51°59′26″N 0°04′24″W	1102610	Upload Photo
Sandon Bury	Sandon, North Hertfordshire	Farmhouse	15th century	9 June 1952	TL3224934486; 51°59′35″N 0°04′31″W	1102608	Upload Photo
Avenue Farm House	St Ippolyts, North Hertfordshire	Farmhouse	Late Medieval	27 May 1968	TL1870427029; 51°55′45″N 0°16′30″W	1102505	Upload Photo
Barn at Maydencroft Manor	Gosmore, St Ippolyts, North Hertfordshire	Barn	c. 1700	27 May 1968	TL1814027381; 51°55′57″N 0°16′59″W	1295380	Upload Photo
Maydencroft Manor	Gosmore, St Ippolyts, North Hertfordshire	Farmhouse	Early 17th century	9 June 1952	TL1818927421; 51°55′58″N 0°16′57″W	1347391	Maydencroft Manor More images
Statue of Cain and Abel at the Bury at West End of Alley running West and North Front at Grid Reference Tl 1861 2177	St Paul's Walden, North Hertfordshire	Statue	18th century	27 May 1968	TL1861021770; 51°52′55″N 0°16′41″W	1347063	Upload Photo
Statue of Charity at the Bury at Head of East Drive at Grid Reference Tl 1875 2162	St Paul's Walden, North Hertfordshire	Statue	c. 1778	27 May 1968	TL1875021620; 51°52′50″N 0°16′34″W	1177074	Upload Photo
The Bury	St Paul's Walden, North Hertfordshire	Country House	Early 18th century	9 June 1952	TL1876021689; 51°52′52″N 0°16′34″W	1307601	The Bury More images
The Old Rectory	Therfield, North Hertfordshire	Rectory	Late 15th century	9 June 1952	TL3354536984; 52°00′55″N 0°03′20″W	1102613	Upload Photo
Church of St Mary	Wallington, North Hertfordshire	Parish Church	14th century	27 May 1968	TL2923633546; 51°59′07″N 0°07′10″W	1347337	Church of St Mary More images
Irongate Farmhouse	Halls Green, Weston, North Hertfordshire	Farmhouse	Late 16th century or early 17th century	28 May 1987	TL2745628682; 51°56′31″N 0°08′50″W	1347439	Upload Photo
Church of St Mary the Virgin	Little Wymondley, Wymondley, North Hertfordshire	Parish Church	Early 12th century	27 May 1968	TL2169227244; 51°55′49″N 0°13′53″W	1347444	Church of St Mary the Virgin More images
Delamere House and Barn attached on West	Great Wymondley, Wymondley, North Hertfordshire	House	Mid 17th century	9 May 1952	TL2131728368; 51°56′26″N 0°14′12″W	1175691	Delamere House and Barn attached on West More images
Redcoats Farmhouse Hotel	Little Wymondley, Wymondley, North Hertfordshire	Farmhouse	Late 17th century	27 May 1968	TL2075926591; 51°55′29″N 0°14′43″W	1102462	Upload Photo
The Manor House	Great Wymondley, Wymondley, North Hertfordshire	Farmhouse	15th century	27 May 1968	TL2134828700; 51°56′37″N 0°14′10″W	1347429	The Manor House
Tithe Barn at the Priory and attached Outbuildings	Little Wymondley, Wymondley, North Hertfordshire	Moat	15th century or earlier	27 May 1968	TL2188027928; 51°56′11″N 0°13′43″W	1175825	Upload Photo
Wymondley Hall	Little Wymondley, Wymondley, North Hertfordshire	Farmhouse	Late 16th century	27 May 1968	TL2158227594; 51°56′01″N 0°13′59″W	1102501	Upload Photo
Wymondley House	Little Wymondley, Wymondley, North Hertfordshire	House	c. 1880	27 May 1968	TL2115527424; 51°55′56″N 0°14′21″W	1175971	Wymondley House More images
Biggin Almshouses	Hitchin, North Hertfordshire	Colonnade	Early 17th century	13 April 1951	TL1855129001; 51°56′49″N 0°16′36″W	1102181	Biggin Almshouses More images
Church of the Holy Saviour	Hitchin, North Hertfordshire	Church	1875-1899	17 June 1974	TL1907129637; 51°57′09″N 0°16′08″W	1102182	Church of the Holy Saviour More images
Halford House	Baldock, North Hertfordshire	House	18th century	8 November 1949	TL2451433870; 51°59′22″N 0°11′17″W	1102099	Upload Photo
Manor House	Baldock, North Hertfordshire	House	18th century	8 November 1949	TL2457833769; 51°59′18″N 0°11′14″W	1102102	Upload Photo
Manor House	14a High Street, Baldock	House	1728	8 November 1949	TL2448233821; 51°59′20″N 0°11′19″W	1102108	Manor House
Manor House Galleries	Hitchin, North Hertfordshire	House	c. 1700	13 April 1951	TL1851829417; 51°57′02″N 0°16′37″W	1347575	Manor House Galleries
North Eastern Block of Buildings at the British Schools Museum	Hitchin, North Hertfordshire	British and Foreign Society School	1810	6 June 1975	TL1865128860; 51°56′44″N 0°16′31″W	1224711	North Eastern Block of Buildings at the British Schools Museum
The Cottage	Baldock	Timber Framed House	16th century or earlier	15 August 1974	TL2437233960; 51°59′25″N 0°11′24″W	1102134	Upload Photo
The Sun Hotel	Hitchin	Assembly Rooms	Georgian	13 April 1951	TL1841928977; 51°56′48″N 0°16′43″W	1102139	The Sun Hotel More images
Western House	35 Tilehouse St, Hitchin	House	Earlier	13 April 1951	TL1817329030; 51°56′50″N 0°16′55″W	1347585	Western House More images
13 White Horse Street	Baldock	Building	Earlier	8 November 1949	TL2447933974; 51°59′25″N 0°11′19″W	1102085	Upload Photo
105 and 106 Bancroft	Hitchin	House	15th century	13 April 1951	TL1853729377; 51°57′01″N 0°16′36″W	1102225	105 and 106 Bancroft More images
81 and 82 Tilehouse Street	Hitchin	Guildhall	15th century	13 April 1951	TL1822829003; 51°56′49″N 0°16′53″W	1102122	81 and 82 Tilehouse Street More images
29 Bucklersbury	Hitchin	Jettied House	16th century	13 April 1951	TL1834728963; 51°56′48″N 0°16′46″W	1102199	29 Bucklersbury More images
33 and 34 Bucklersbury	Hitchin	Building	15th century or 16th century	13 April 1951	TL1833428996; 51°56′49″N 0°16′47″W	1296286	33 and 34 Bucklersbury More images
3 and 5 Church Street	Baldock	Building	18th century	8 November 1949	TL2436733977; 51°59′25″N 0°11′25″W	1102135	Upload Photo
8–12 Market Place	Hitchin	Shop	Recent	13 April 1951	TL1843329081; 51°56′51″N 0°16′42″W	1102174	8–12 Market Place
23 and 23a High Street	Baldock	House	18th century	8 November 1949	TL2458633757; 51°59′18″N 0°11′13″W	1347633	Upload Photo
31 and 32 Bridge Street	Hitchin	Jettied House	C15-16	13 April 1951	TL1845428847; 51°56′44″N 0°16′41″W	1102191	31 and 32 Bridge Street More images
