= St Martin's Church, Knebworth =

Church in Hertfordshire, England

Coordinates: 51.8654°N 0.1818°W

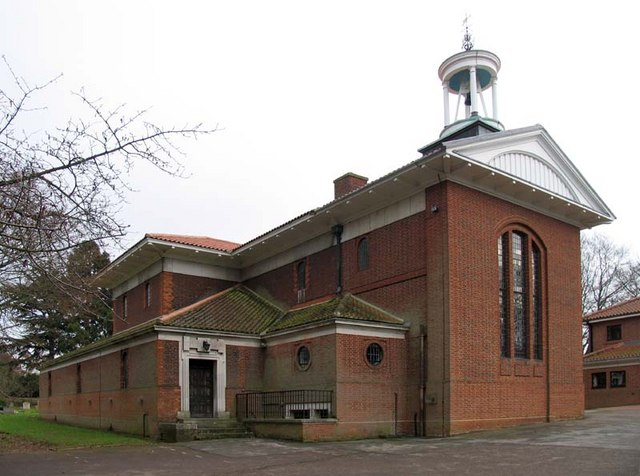
- The west front

- Shown within Hertfordshire
- Denomination: Church of England

Architecture
- Heritage designation: Grade II* listed
- Architect(s): Edwin Lutyens, Albert Richardson
- Style: Neoclassical
- Completed: 20th century

Administration
- Province: Canterbury
- Diocese: St Albans
- Archdeaconry: Hertford

Clergy
- Rector: Rev Charles King

St Martin's Church is an active Anglican church in Knebworth, Hertfordshire, England. The building, which is designated grade II*, was designed by Edwin Lutyens in an Italianate style. It is constructed in brick.

== History ==
The church was built to serve the expanding settlement on the Great North Road near Knebworth railway station, over a mile from the medieval parish church St Mary and St Thomas. Before World War I there was a plan by the local landowners, the Bulwer-Lytton family, to develop Knebworth as a type of garden village. This plan was only partly realised, but it resulted in several commissions for Lutyens including a clubhouse for the local golf course and Homewood, a dower house for his mother-in-law, Edith Bulwer-Lytton, Countess of Lytton.

Construction began in 1914, but the building was not completed according to the architect's intentions. When the church was consecrated in 1915, it was in an incomplete state because of cutbacks caused by World War I. The west front was added in the 1960s and was designed by Sir Albert Richardson. Richardson did not follow Lutyens' intention to give the church a portico, but his contribution has been described as "harmonious".

== Interior ==
The plastered interior features limited use of Portland stone. The aisles are separated from the nave by small arches on Tuscan columns.

Details of the organ are given in the National Pipe Organ Register. It was built by Willis and was installed in the 1960s replacing an older instrument. Its pipes are in "tubs" on each site of the chancel entrance.

== Conservation ==
On 27 May 1968, the church was designated a grade II* listed building.

== See also ==
- Homewood, Knebworth
- St Jude's Church, Hampstead Garden Suburb
