= Lady Constance Bulwer-Lytton =

British suffragette (1869–1923)

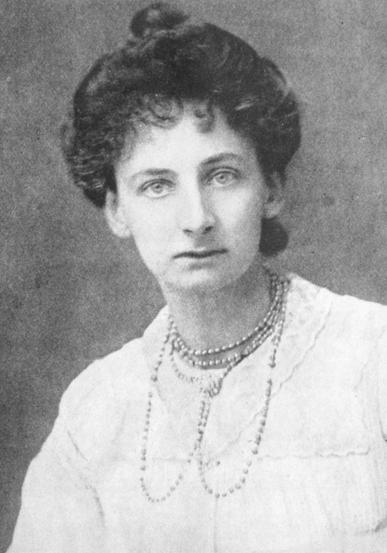
- Born: 12 February 1869; Vienna, Austria
- Died: 22 May 1923 (aged 54); London, England
- Resting place: Lytton Mausoleum, Knebworth Park
- Other name: Jane Warton
- Occupation: Suffragette
- Parent(s): Robert Bulwer-Lytton, 1st Earl of Lytton; Edith Villiers

Lady Constance Georgina Bulwer-Lytton (12 February 1869 – 22 May 1923), usually known as Constance Lytton, was an influential British suffragette activist, writer, speaker and campaigner for prison reform, votes for women, and birth control. She used the name Jane Warton to avoid receiving special treatment when imprisoned for suffragist protests.

Although born and raised in the privileged ruling class of British society, Lytton rejected this background to join the Women's Social and Political Union (WSPU), the most militant group of suffragette activists campaigning for "Votes for Women".

She was subsequently imprisoned four times, including once in Walton gaol in Liverpool under the nom de guerre of Jane Warton, where she was force fed while on hunger strike. She chose the alias and disguise of Jane Warton, an "ugly London seamstress", to avoid receiving special treatment and privileges because of her family connections: she was the daughter of a viceroy and the sister of a member of the House of Lords. She wrote pamphlets on women's rights, articles in The Times newspaper, and a book on her experiences, Prisons and Prisoners, which was published in 1914.

While imprisoned in Holloway during March 1909, Lytton used a piece of broken enamel from a hairpin to cut the letter "V" into the flesh of her breast, placed exactly over the heart. (The "V" came from "Votes for Women", as she had planned to scratch the whole phrase "beginning over the heart and ending it on [her] face".)

Lytton remained unmarried, because her mother refused her permission to marry a man from a "lower social order", while she refused to contemplate marrying anyone else.

Her heart attack, stroke, and early death at the age of 54 have been attributed in part to the trauma of her hunger strike and force feeding by the prison authorities.

== Early life and family ==
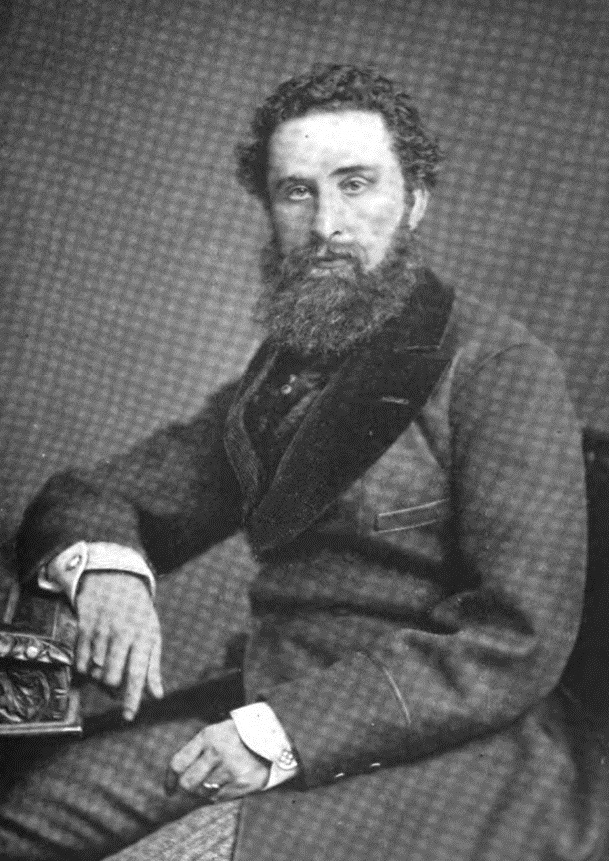
Robert Bulwer-Lytton, 1st Earl of Lytton

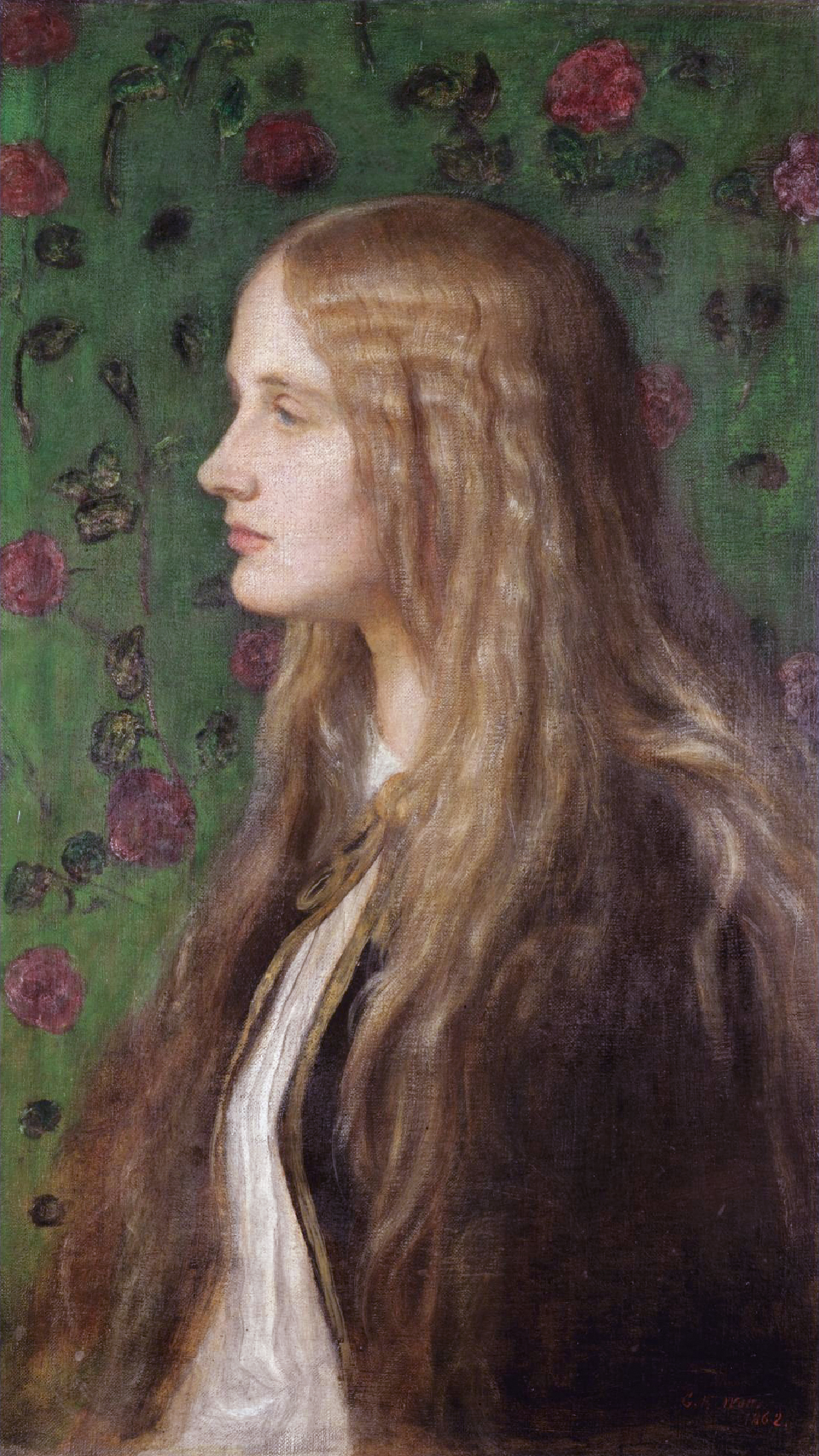
Edith Villiers

Lytton was the third of seven children of Robert Bulwer-Lytton, 1st Earl of Lytton and Edith Villiers. She spent some of her early years in India, where her father was the Governor-General; it was he who made the proclamation that Queen Victoria was the Empress of India. (Note: Lytton's maternal grandparents were Edward Ernest Villiers (1806–1843) and Elizabeth Charlotte Liddell. Edward Ernest Villiers was a son of George Villiers and Theresa Parker. Elizabeth Charlotte Liddell was a daughter of Thomas Liddell, 1st Baron Ravensworth and his wife Maria Susannah Simpson. George Villiers was a son of Thomas Villiers, 1st Earl of Clarendon and Charlotte Capell. Theresa Parker was a daughter of John Parker, 1st Baron Boringdon and his second wife Theresa Robinson. Maria Susannah Simpson was a daughter of John Simpson and Anne Lyon. Charlotte Capell was a daughter of William Capell, 3rd Earl of Essex and Lady Jane Hyde. Theresa Robinson was a daughter of Thomas Robinson, 1st Baron Grantham and Frances Worsley. Anne Lyon was a daughter of Thomas Lyon, 8th Earl of Strathmore and Kinghorne and Jean Nicholsen. Lady Jane Hyde was a daughter of Henry Hyde, 4th Earl of Clarendon and Jane Leveson-Gower. Her paternal grandparents were the novelists Edward Bulwer-Lytton, 1st Baron Lytton and Rosina Doyle Wheeler. He was a florid, popular writer of his day, coining such phrases as "the great unwashed", "pursuit of the almighty dollar", "the pen is mightier than the sword", and the infamous incipit "It was a dark and stormy night". Constance Lytton's great-grandmother was the author and women's rights campaigner Anna Wheeler.) Her siblings were:

- Edward Rowland John Bulwer-Lytton (1865–1871)
- Lady Elizabeth Edith "Betty" Bulwer-Lytton (12 June 1867 – 28 March 1942). Married Gerald Balfour, 2nd Earl of Balfour, brother of the future Prime Minister Arthur Balfour.
- Henry Meredith Edward Bulwer-Lytton (1872–1874)
- Lady Emily Bulwer-Lytton (1874–1964). Married the architect Edwin Lutyens. Associate and confidante of Jiddu Krishnamurti.
- Victor Bulwer-Lytton, 2nd Earl of Lytton (1876–1947), married Pamela Chichele-Plowden, an early flame of Sir Winston Churchill, who had met her while playing polo at Secunderabad.
- Neville Bulwer-Lytton, 3rd Earl of Lytton (6 February 1879 – 9 February 1951)

In the early years in India, Lytton was educated by a series of governesses and reportedly had a lonely childhood. She played the piano and wished to be a pianist. She apparently met Winston Churchill while living in India, where he was an unsuccessful rival to her brother Victor for the hand of Pamela Chichele-Plowden. She is reported to have said: "The first time you see Winston Churchill you see all his faults, and the rest of your life you spend discovering his virtues." Although she grew up in England surrounded by many of the great artistic, political and literary names of the day, she rejected the aristocratic way of life. After her father died, she retired from public view to care for her mother, rejecting attempts to interest her in the outside world.

Lytton remained unmarried until her death; in 1892 her mother refused her permission to marry a man from a "lower social order". For several years she waited in vain for her mother to change her mind, while refusing to contemplate marrying anyone else.

In 1897 her aunt, Theresa Earle, published her gardening guide Pot-Pourri from a Surrey Garden. She had been encouraged to write this by Lytton who typed some of the text. The book sold quickly and well and in one of the later editions Lytton added a section on Japanese flower arranging.

Lytton became a vegetarian in 1902 and was an advocate of animal rights.

== Women's suffrage ==
The reclusive phase of Lytton's life started to change in 1905 when she was left £1,000 in the estate of her great-aunt/godmother, Lady Bloomfield. She donated this to the revival of Morris dancing and her family records state that "Her brother Neville suggested that she gave it to the Esperance Club, a small singing and dancing group for working class girls", where part of their remit was teaching Morris dancing. The Esperance club was founded by Emmeline Pethick-Lawrence and Mary Neal in response to distressing conditions for girls in the London dress trade.

=== (1908) Conversion to suffragette cause ===
Between September 1908 and October 1909 Constance Lytton's conversion to the militant suffragette cause was complete. On 10 September 1908 she wrote to Adela Smith:

I met some suffragettes down at the [Green Lady Hostel run by the Esperance] club in Littlehampton... They have come into personal first-hand contact with prison abuses. My hobby of prison reform has thereby taken on new vigour... I intend to interview the female inspector of Holloway prison, and will take part in the Suffragette breakfast with the next batch of released Suffrage prisoners on 16 September. I had a long talk with Mrs. Pethick-Lawrence. She mostly talked Woman Suffrage, about which, though I sympathise with the cause, she left me unconverted as to my criticisms of some of their methods.

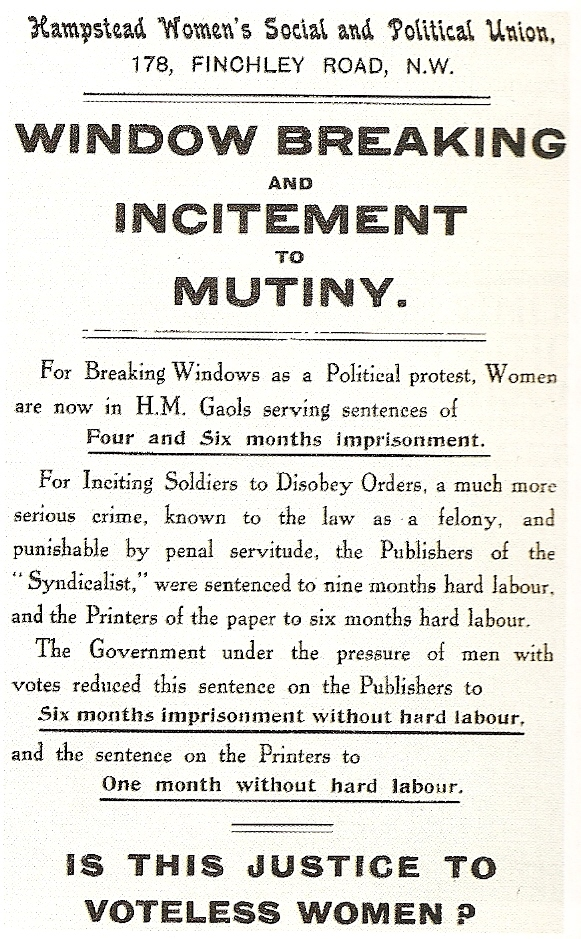
Suffragette handbill

She subsequently met other suffragettes, including Annie Kenney and Emmeline Pethick-Lawrence, at the Green Lady Hostel and on a tour of Holloway prison. On 14 October 1908, she wrote to her mother:

I went to the Suffragette Office to see Mrs. Lawrence and to congratulate her on the meeting of the day before, inquire the latest news, and finally say: "You know my reservations as to some of your methods, but my sympathies are much more with you than with any of your opponents... I want to be of use if I can. Is there anything I can possibly do to help you?" A good deal of talk ensued. She said, "Yes," I could help them. Could I see to it that Herbert Gladstone was asked to treat the Suffragettes as political offenders, which they are, and not as common criminals, which they are not?

In Prison and Prisoners, she stated: "Women had tried repeatedly, and always in vain, every peaceable means open to them of influencing successive governments. Processions and petitions were absolutely useless. In January 1909 I decided to become a member of the Women's Social and Political Union (WSPU)." Working for the WSPU she made speeches throughout the country, and used her family connections to campaign in Parliament. She wrote to the Home Secretary Herbert Gladstone asking for Emmeline Pankhurst and Christabel Pankhurst to be released from prison.

On Friday, 8th October 1909, Christabel Pankhurst and I were on our way to Newcastle. I had made up my mind that I was going to throw a stone. We went to the Haymarket [an area in Central Newcastle] where the car with Mr. Lloyd George [Chancellor of the Exchequer] would probably pass. As the motor appeared I stepped out into the road, stood straight in front of the car, shouted out, "How can you, who say you back the women's cause, stay on in a government which refuses them the vote, and is persecuting them for asking it," and threw a stone at the car. I aimed low to avoid injuring the chauffeur or passengers.

=== (1909) Imprisonment and self-injury in Holloway ===
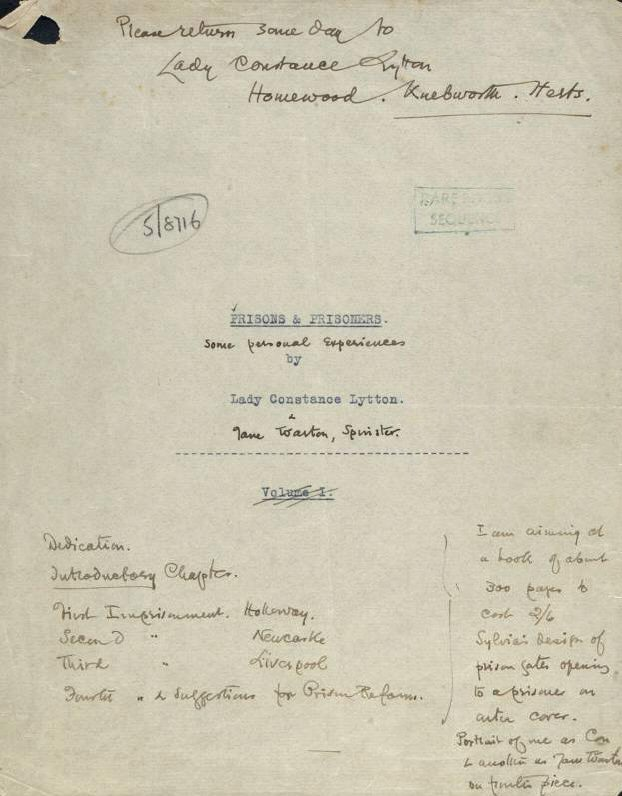
Manuscript of Prisons and Prisoners, annotated by Constance Lytton: "I am aiming at a book of about 300 pages, to cost 2/6d. Sylvia's description of prison gates opening to a prisoner on outer cover. Portrait of me as Con. Another as Jane Warton on frontispiece."

Lytton was imprisoned in Holloway prison twice during 1909, after demonstrating at the House of Commons, but her ill health (a weak heart) meant that she spent most of her sentence in the infirmary. When the authorities discovered her identity, the daughter of Lord Lytton, they ordered her release. The British government were also aware that her health problems and hunger striking could lead to martyrdom. Infuriated by such inequality of justice she wrote to the Liverpool Daily Post in October 1909 to complain about the favourable treatment she had received.

On 24 February 1909, Lytton wrote to her mother about prison and reform in Prisons and Prisoners:

My Angel Mother... If you ever see this letter it will mean that after joining the deputation I have been arrested and shall not see you again until I have been to Holloway... Prisons, as you know, have been my hobby. What maternity there lurks in me has for years past been gradually awakening over the fate of prisoners, the deliberate, cruel harm that is done to them, their souls and bodies, the ignorant, exasperating waste of good opportunities in connection with them, till now the thought of them, the yearning after them, turns in me and tugs at me as vitally and irrepressibly as ever a physical child can call upon its mother.

While she was imprisoned in Holloway Prison during March 1909 she started to deliberately injure her body. Her plan was to cut "Votes for Women" from her breast to her cheek, so that it would always be visible. But after completing the "V" on her breast and ribs she requested sterile dressings to avoid blood poisoning, and her plan was aborted by the authorities. Lytton wrote of the self-injury action in Prisons and Prisoners:

I had decided to write the words "Votes for Women" on my body, scratching it in my skin with a needle, beginning over the heart and ending it on my face. I proposed to show the first half of the inscription to the doctors, telling them that as I knew how much appearances were respected by officials, I thought it well to warn them that the last letter and a full stop would come upon my cheek, and be still quite fresh and visible on the day of my release.

The next morning before breakfast I set to work in real earnest and, using each of these [needle and broken hatpin] in turn, I succeeded in producing a very fine V just over my heart. This was the work of fully twenty minutes, and in my zeal I made a deeper impression than I had intended. The scratch bled to a certain extent. I had no wish for a blood-poisoning sequel, and, fearing the contact with the coarse prison clothes, when the wardress came to fetch me for breakfast I asked her for a small piece of lint and plaster.

I was taken down to the Senior Medical Officer...and the ward superintendent, who ushered me into his presence and exposed the scratched "V" for his inspection, were evidently much put out. I felt all a craftsman's satisfaction in my job. The V was very clearly and evenly printed in spite of the varying material of its background, a rib bone forming an awkward bump. As I pointed out to the doctor, it had been placed exactly over the heart, and visibly recorded the pulsation of that organ as clearly as a watch hand, so that he no longer need be put to the trouble of the stethoscope.

=== (1909) Imprisonment in Newcastle ===
In October 1909 Constance Lytton was arrested for a second time in Newcastle. She had thrown a stone wrapped in paper bearing the message "To Lloyd George – Rebellion against tyranny is obedience to God – Deeds, not words". Her message was in response to the government's new policy of force-feeding imprisoned suffragettes who were on hunger strike. She was sentenced to one month in Newcastle Gaol.

=== (1910) Jane Warton in Liverpool, Walton gaol ===
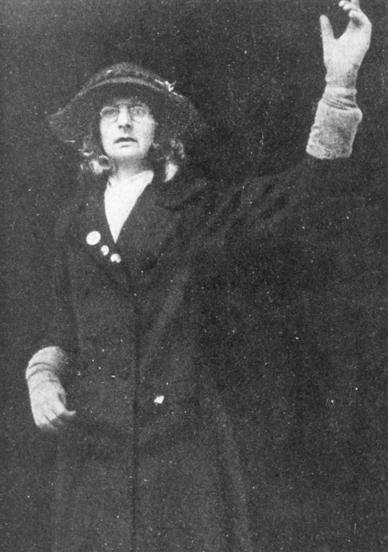
Lytton posing as Jane Warton, a London seamstress, at a protest in Liverpool (1910)

In January 1910, convinced that poorer prisoners were treated badly, Lytton travelled to Liverpool disguised as a working-class London seamstress named Jane Warton. In disguise she spoke at an event with Jennie Baines and Patricia Woodlock and led a procession to the Prison Governor's house demanding the "stain" of force-feeding be removed from Liverpool. She was arrested after an incident of rocks being thrown at an MP's car, imprisoned in Walton gaol for 14 days "hard labour" and force-fed eight times. After her release, although desperately weak, she wrote accounts of her experience for The Times and Votes for Women (the monthly journal of the WSPU, launched in 1907). She went on to lecture on the subject of her experience of the conditions which suffragette prisoners endured. It is thought that her speeches and letters helped to end the practice of force-feeding.

Lytton wrote of the Jane Warton episode in Prisons and Prisoners:

I joined the W.S.P.U. again, filling up the membership card as Miss Jane Warton. The choice of a name had been easy. When I came out of Holloway Prison, a distant relative, by name Mr. F. Warburton, wrote me an appreciative letter...but Warburton was too distinguished a name; that would at once attract attention. I must leave out the "bur" and make it "Warton." "Jane" was the name of Joan of Arc (for Jeanne is more often translated into "Jane" than "Joan") and would bring me comfort in distress.

I accomplished my disguise in Manchester, going to a different shop for every part of it, for safety's sake. I had noticed several times while I was in prison that prisoners of unprepossessing appearance obtained least favour, so I was determined to put ugliness to the test. I had my hair cut short and parted, in early Victorian fashion, in smooth bands down the side of my face. This, combined with the resentful bristles of my newly-cut back hair, produced a curious effect. I wished to bleach my hair as well, but the hairdresser refused point-blank to do this, and the stuff that I bought for the purpose at the chemist's proved quite ineffective. A tweed hat, a long green cloth coat, which I purchased for 8s. 6d., a woollen scarf and woollen gloves, a white silk neck-kerchief, a pair of pince-nez spectacles, a purse, a net-bag to contain some of my papers, and my costume was complete. I had removed my own initials from my underclothing, and bought the ready-made initials "J.W." to sew on in their stead, but to my regret I had not time to achieve this finishing touch.

I returned to the house of my friends, selected from their garden small, flat stones in case of need, which I wrapped in paper, and snatched a hasty meal. My kind hostess had heard that I was a vegetarian, and had provided a most appetising dish of stewed white pears. The police then took hold of me. As for once it was my object above all else to get arrested and imprisoned, I began discharging my stones, not throwing them, but limply dropping them over the hedge into the Governor's garden. One of them just touched the shoulder of a man who had rushed up on seeing me arrested. I apologised to him. Two policemen then held me fast by the arms and marched me off to the police station.

Walton Gaol, Liverpool (1910)

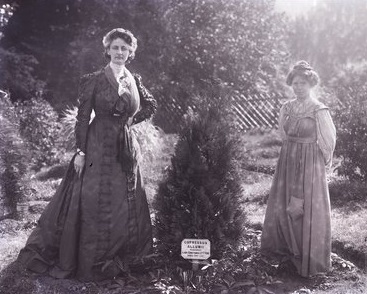
Lady Constance and Annie Kenney at the Suffragettes Rest at Eagle House in Batheaston, Somerset. In 1910 the leading suffragettes planted an arboretum of circa fifty trees to commemorate their work, however all but one were destroyed by a 1960s house building project

==== Force-feeding ====
He said if I resisted so much with my teeth, he would have to feed me through the nose. The pain of it was intense and at last I must have given way for he got the gag between my teeth, when he proceeded to turn it much more than necessary until my jaws were fastened wide apart, far more than they could go naturally. Then he put down my throat a tube which seemed to me much too wide and was something like four feet in length. The irritation of the tube was excessive. I choked the moment it touched my throat until it had got down. Then the food was poured in quickly; it made me sick a few seconds after it was down and the action of the sickness made my body and legs double up, but the wardresses instantly pressed back my head and the doctor leant on my knees. The horror of it was more than I can describe. I was sick over the doctor and wardresses, and it seemed a long time before they took the tube out. As the doctor left he gave me a slap on the cheek, not violently, but, as it were, to express his contemptuous disapproval, and he seemed to take for granted that my distress was assumed... Before long I heard the sounds of the forced feeding in the next cell to mine. It was almost more than I could bear, it was Elsie Howey, I was sure. When the ghastly process was over and all quiet, I tapped on the wall and called out at the top of my voice, which wasn't much just then, "No surrender," and there came the answer past any doubt in Elsie's voice, "No surrender."

Lytton's health continued to deteriorate and she suffered a heart attack in August 1910, and a series of strokes which paralysed the right side of her body. Undaunted, she used her left hand to write Prisons and Prisoners (1914), which became influential in prison reform. The book is also notable for making an explicit link between animal rights and women's rights.

On 9 October 1909 Lytton was awarded a Hunger Strike Medal by the WSPU.

=== 1911 onwards ===
In June 1911, Lytton's brother had a letter from Ellen Avery, the local school headmistress, and forty-one other "Suffrage women of Knebworth and Woolmer Green", thanking the Lyttons for having "laboured for our Cause" and "for faith in us as Women": seventeen were WSPU signatories, including Constance's own cook Ethel Smith, Dora Spong, and nine who were in the non-militant suffragist NUWSS.

In November 1911 Lytton was imprisoned in Holloway for the fourth time, after breaking windows in the Houses of Parliament, or of a post office in Victoria Street, London. However, conditions had improved, "all was civility; it was unrecognisable from the first time I had been there", and suffragettes were treated as political prisoners.

After the WSPU ended its militant campaign at the outbreak of war in 1914, Lytton gave her support to Marie Stopes' campaign to establish birth control clinics.

In January 1918 parliament passed a bill giving women over 30 the vote if they were married to a property owner or were one themselves.

== Death and commemoration ==
Endowed with a celestial sense of humour, boundless sympathy, and rare musical talent, she devoted the later years of her life to the political enfranchisement of women and sacrificed her health and talents in helping to bring victory to this cause.

— Epitaph to Lady Constance Lytton in the family mausoleum in Knebworth Park

Constance Lytton never fully recovered from her prison treatment, heart attack and strokes, and was nursed at Knebworth by her mother. They lived at Homewood, a house designed by Constance's brother-in-law, Edwin Lutyens. She died in 1923, aged 54, only days after moving out of Homewood to a flat in Paddington, London, in an attempt to restart an active life. At her funeral, the purple, white and green Suffragette colours were laid on her coffin. Her ashes lie in the family mausoleum in Knebworth Park.

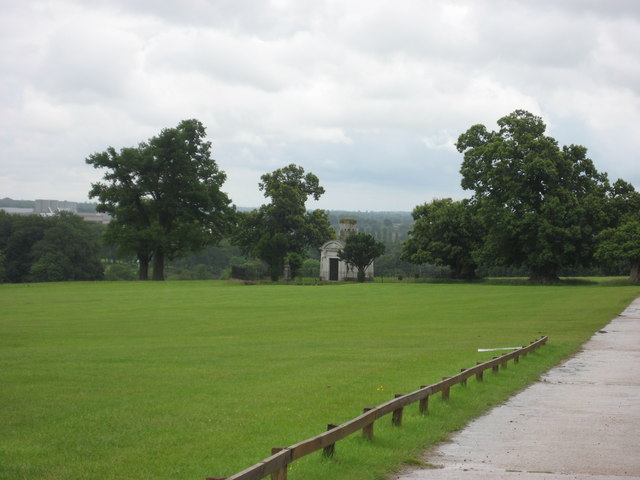

== In popular culture ==
Lytton appears as a character in the 1974 BBC television drama Shoulder to Shoulder. She is played by Judy Parfitt.

== Timeline ==
Edited extract from the Knebworth House memorial

- 1869 – Lady Constance Georgina Lytton born.
- 1880 – Family leaves India.
- 1887 – Sister Betty marries Gerald Balfour (Arthur's brother).
- 1897 – Sister Emily marries Edwin Lutyens, the architect.
- 1908 – Godmother Lady Bloomfield dies, leaving her £1000. Lytton subsequently meets Annie Kenny and Emmeline Pethick-Lawrence.
- 1909 – Becomes an official member of the WSPU.
- 1909 – Imprisoned for the first time in February 1909.
- 1909 – Her pamphlet "No Votes for Women: A Reply to Some Recent Anti-Suffrage Publications" is published.
- 1909 – Imprisoned for 2nd time in Holloway in October 1909.
- 1910 – Disguises herself as Jane Warton and imprisoned for 3rd time in Walton Gaol, Liverpool, in terrible conditions. Force fed several times.
- 1910 – Writes about her experiences in The Times.
- 1911 – Imprisoned for the 4th time, in Holloway in November 1911
- 1912 – Suffers a stroke from which she never fully recovers, but continues to write Prisons and Prisoners, an account of her time in custody.
- 1914 – Prisons and Prisoners is published.
- 1918 – Representation of the People Act 1918 gives the vote to all men, and to women over the age of 30.
- 1923 – Lytton dies aged 54.
- 1928 – Representation of the People Act 1928 gives the vote to women on the same grounds as men.

== See also ==
- History of feminism
- List of suffragists and suffragettes
- Shoulder to Shoulder BBC/Warner Bros. Television drama, 1974

== Archives ==
- A collection of "Letters of Constance Lytton" is held at The Women's Library at The London School of Economics and Political Science, ref 9/21.

The historian Brian Harrison interviewed people with memories of Lytton in the 1970s as part of the Suffrage Interviews project, titled Oral evidence on the suffragette and suffragist movements: the Brian Harrison interviews. These interviewees included:

- Anne Lytton, born 1901 (daughter of Lytton’s brother Neville). Interview 110
- Elisabeth Lutyens, born 1906 (daughter of Lytton's sister Emily). Interview 49
- Mary Lutyens, born 1908 (daughter of Lytton's sister Emily). Interview 85

They describe their aunt's appearance and personality as well as her relationships with other members of the family.

== Bibliography ==
- Jenkins, Lyndsey (2015). Lady Constance Lytton: Aristocrat, Suffragette, Martyr. London: Biteback Publishing. ISBN 978-1-84954-795-6.
- Thomas, Sue. 'Scenes in the writing of "Constance Lytton and Jane Warton, spinster" : contextualising a cross-class dresser'. Women's History Review, 12:1 (2003), 51–71. Publisher: Triangle Journals; Routledge. ISSN 0961-2025.
