= Elizabeth Bulwer-Lytton =

Elizabeth Barbara Bulwer-Lytton (née Warburton-Lytton; 1 May 1770 – 19 December 1843) was a member of the Lytton family of Knebworth House in Hertfordshire, England.

== Life ==
Her parents were Richard Warburton-Lytton (1745–1810) and Elizabeth Jodrell. In 1798, she married General William Earle Bulwer (1757–1807), and the couple lived at Heydon Hall in Norfolk. Their first son, William Earle Lytton Bulwer, was born the year after their marriage. A second son, Henry, was born in 1801, followed by Edward in 1803.

After her father's death, Elizabeth Bulwer resumed her father's surname, by a royal licence of 1811. That year she returned to Knebworth House, which by then had become dilapidated. She renovated it by demolishing three of its four sides and adding Gothic towers and battlements to the remaining building. This Tudor Gothic work was carried out in 1813 by John Biagio Rebecca.

She lived at Knebworth with her son, the writer Edward Bulwer-Lytton, until her death. Because of a long-standing dispute she had with the church, she is buried not with her ancestors at St Mary's Knebworth, but in the Lytton Mausoleum nearby which she commissioned from John Buonarotti Papworth in 1817.

Elizabeth's death greatly affected her son, as described in a letter originally published in 1845, and again in a posthumous 1875 collection. As to his mother, in her room, Bulwer-Lytton "had inscribed above the mantlepiece a request that future generations preserve the room as his beloved mother had used it", and which remains essentially unchanged to this day.
