= Byworth =

Byworth may refer to:

- Byworth, West Sussex, a village near Petworth, England
- Christopher Byworth (1939–2017), English Anglican priest, liturgist, theologian, and academic
- Tony Byworth, British journalist
