= Richard Warburton Lytton =

Richard John Warburton Lytton FRS (né Warburton; 26 August 1745 – 29 December 1810) was an English landowner and member of the Lytton family. He was the father of Elizabeth Barbara Lytton, and the grandfather of Henry Bulwer, 1st Baron Dalling and Bulwer and Edward Bulwer-Lytton, 1st Baron Lytton.

== Early life ==
Richard Warburton was the son of William Warburton, of Yarrow, Queen's County, Ireland, by Barbara Lytton. He was baptised 5 September 1745 at St Anne's Church, Soho. He was educated at Harrow School, under Robert Carey Sumner, where he knew Sir William Jones, Samuel Parr, and William Bennet.

Warburton added Lytton to his name when, in 1762, he inherited Knebworth House from his uncle John Robinson-Lytton. In 1793, the inheritance was the subject of a Court of Chancery case that stated that Lytton could only deservedly claim full possession of Knebworth House and Park subsequent to the death in 1790 of Leonora Robinson Lytton (née Brereton), who was first the widow of Richard's uncle and second the widow of the Scottish composer James Oswald.

Lytton, as Richard Warburton, was admitted to University College, Oxford: not to Christ Church, Oxford, which was suggested in his grandson's memoir. At Oxford he knew Richard Paul Jodrell, to whose younger sister he was married.

== Associations ==
Lytton was elected to the Royal Society in 1772. A letter he wrote in 1774 to Samuel Parr stated that he had been canvassing for Thomas Halsey, the Hertfordshire Member of Parliament. He attended the Greek tragedy presented by Parr's pupils at Stanmore in 1775/6, an innovation. Thomas Maurice may have known of him, as Bulwer-Lytton suggests, but was at University College some time later. He was another connection of Parr, and translator of Oedipus Rex, still at university at that time.

According to a surviving journal, Lytton associated in the 1780s with Granville Sharp and Andrew Kippis. Thomas Day the abolitionist was a university friend.

== Later life ==
After the French Revolution, Lytton was in France where he owned an estate at Boulogne, and there associated with French thinkers. He left in a hurry as war broke out, and his house was confiscated. He sheltered French exiles, including the Abbé Béliard, who became a teacher at the school run in Enfield by John Clarke. Lytton had been introduced to Clarke by Joseph Priestley. Charles Cowden Clarke, John Clarke's son, described a visit to Lytton, who was then living in Enfield. He later moved to Ramsgate.

Lytton died on 29 December 1810 and was buried 5 January 1811. A monumental inscription to him is in the south aisle of St Laurence, Ramsgate.

== Family ==
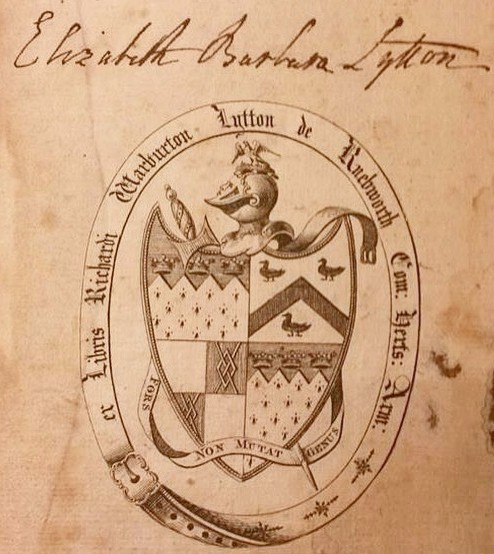
Bookplate of Richard Warburton Lytton, with signature of his daughter Elizabeth Barbara Lytton

Lytton married in 1768 Elizabeth Jodrell, daughter of Paul Jodrell, Member of Parliament for Old Sarum, who survived him, dying 1 November 1818. The couple separated permanently after about three years, with one child. Elizabeth went to live in Upper Seymour Street, London, while Richard lived in various provincial locations, not at Knebworth House. At age 21, in 1766, he had come into much of the estate left to him, but not the Mansion House which remained with his aunt Leonora or Eleonora.

Their daughter Elizabeth married William Earle Bulwer, and was the mother of Henry Bulwer, 1st Baron Dalling and Bulwer and Edward Bulwer-Lytton, 1st Baron Lytton.

== Legacy and literary references ==
Edward Bulwer-Lytton inherited Richard Warburton Lytton's library, and was influenced by its works of German philosophy. Edward based the character Austin Caxton in The Caxtons, an unworldly scholar, on his grandfather Richard. Bulwer-Lytton's character 'Clutterbuck', in his earlier novel Pelham, is also supposed to be based on Lytton. Lytton, who is said to have written and then destroyed a drama in Hebrew, has been called eccentric.
