= Knebworth =

Village in Hertfordshire, England

Coordinates: 51.866°N 0.184°W

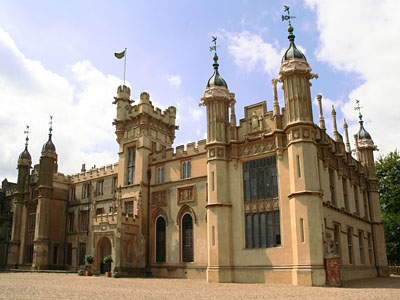
- Knebworth House

- Location within Hertfordshire
- Population: 4,538 (Parish, 2021)
- OS grid reference: TL252201
- District: North Hertfordshire
- Shire county: Hertfordshire
- Region: East
- Country: England
- Sovereign state: United Kingdom
- Post town: KNEBWORTH
- Postcode district: SG3
- Dialling code: 01438
- Police: Hertfordshire
- Fire: Hertfordshire
- Ambulance: East of England
- UK Parliament: Stevenage

Knebworth is a village and civil parish in the north of Hertfordshire, England, immediately south of Stevenage. The civil parish covers an area between the villages of Datchworth, Woolmer Green, Codicote, Kimpton, Whitwell, St Paul's Walden and Langley, and encompasses the village of Knebworth, the small village of Old Knebworth and Knebworth House.

== History ==
There is evidence of people living in the area as far back as the 11th century as it is mentioned in the Domesday Book of 1086 where it is referred to as Chenepeworde with a recorded population of 33 households and land belonging to Eskil (of Ware), a thegn of King Edward the Confessor. The name 'Knebworth' may mean either the farm belonging to the 5th century Saxon Dane, Cnebba, or simply There is an alternative interpretation, though, that the name could instead have meant 'village on the hill'. The spelling of the name 'Chenepeworde' has since changed to become the modern spelling of 'Knebworth'.

The original village, now known as Old Knebworth, developed within the parish of the Church of St Mary and St Thomas. The stone church was built around 1120, and although the Domesday Book makes no mention of the church there is speculation to suggest there may have been a Saxon church of timber on the site before the more substantial one was built.

The manor passed into the hands of the Lytton family around 1492, when the manor house was rebuilt to a Late Gothic manor house. The house changed very little until the 19th century when it was re-modelled into the present-day Tudor Gothic building.

Knebworth was a largely agricultural community, producing wheat and barley in particular. The proximity to London via the Great North Road (subsequently the A1, and now the B197 since the opening of the A1(M) motorway in 1962) made it possible to transport produce.

By the start of the 19th century, Knebworth had a population of around 250 people, but the Industrial Revolution and the railway coming to Knebworth changed that. Initial development of the newer Knebworth village was centred a mile to the east of Old Knebworth on the area around the new railway station and the Great North Road. The route of the railway – which was originally meant to go through Codicote to the west – was negotiated by Lord Lytton so that it would go through the grounds of Knebworth, and have a station built there. The Great Northern Railway, itself opened in 1850, opened a station at Knebworth in 1884. The station created a brand-new settlement called Knebworth Station – known later as New Knebworth, and later still, just as Knebworth – with the original village becoming known as Old Knebworth. Lord Lytton set up a company, Knebworth Garden Villages, to build homes either side of the railway embankment. Prior to this, only a few farmhouses had stood nearby, including Swangley's farm and Deards End farm. The station site eventually grew to include a signal box and goods yard to the north, approximately where Kerr Close is now.

Migrants from London, neighbouring counties, and even more distant areas of the country came to work in the new settlement.

At the turn of the century the architect Edwin Lutyens built Homewood, south-east of Old Knebworth, as a dower house for Edith Bulwer-Lytton. Her daughter, the suffragette Constance Lytton, also lived there, until just before her death in 1923. Edith's third daughter, Lady Emily Bulwer-Lytton, had married Lutyens in 1897. Lutyens was responsible for a number of notable buildings in the new village of Knebworth as well, including the Bank, St Martin's church, the Golf Clubhouse and the telephone exchange.

Knebworth has, since 1974, been famously associated with numerous major open air rock and pop concerts at the Knebworth Festival. These include Knebworth Fair in 1976, featuring the Rolling Stones and Lynyrd Skynyrd, which had an attendance of almost 250,000 as well as Queen's final live performance with Freddie Mercury took place on 9 August 1986 and drew an attendance estimated at 125,000.

On 30 June 1990, Pink Floyd, Status Quo, Paul McCartney, Eric Clapton, Elton John, Phil Collins, Dire Straits, Genesis, Robert Plant & Jimmy Page, Tears for Fears, Cliff Richard & The Shadows played at Knebworth. Nearly 31 years later, on 30 April 2021, Pink Floyd released this performance as a live album titled: Live at Knebworth 1990.

In 1996, Oasis played there to a quarter of a million people over two nights, for which 2.5 million people (4% of the British population) applied for tickets, a figure that could have led to 20 sold-out nights, and remains the highest recorded demand for a British concert to date. Most recently, for three nights in August 2003 Robbie Williams performed to the largest crowd ever assembled for a single performer.

== Governance ==
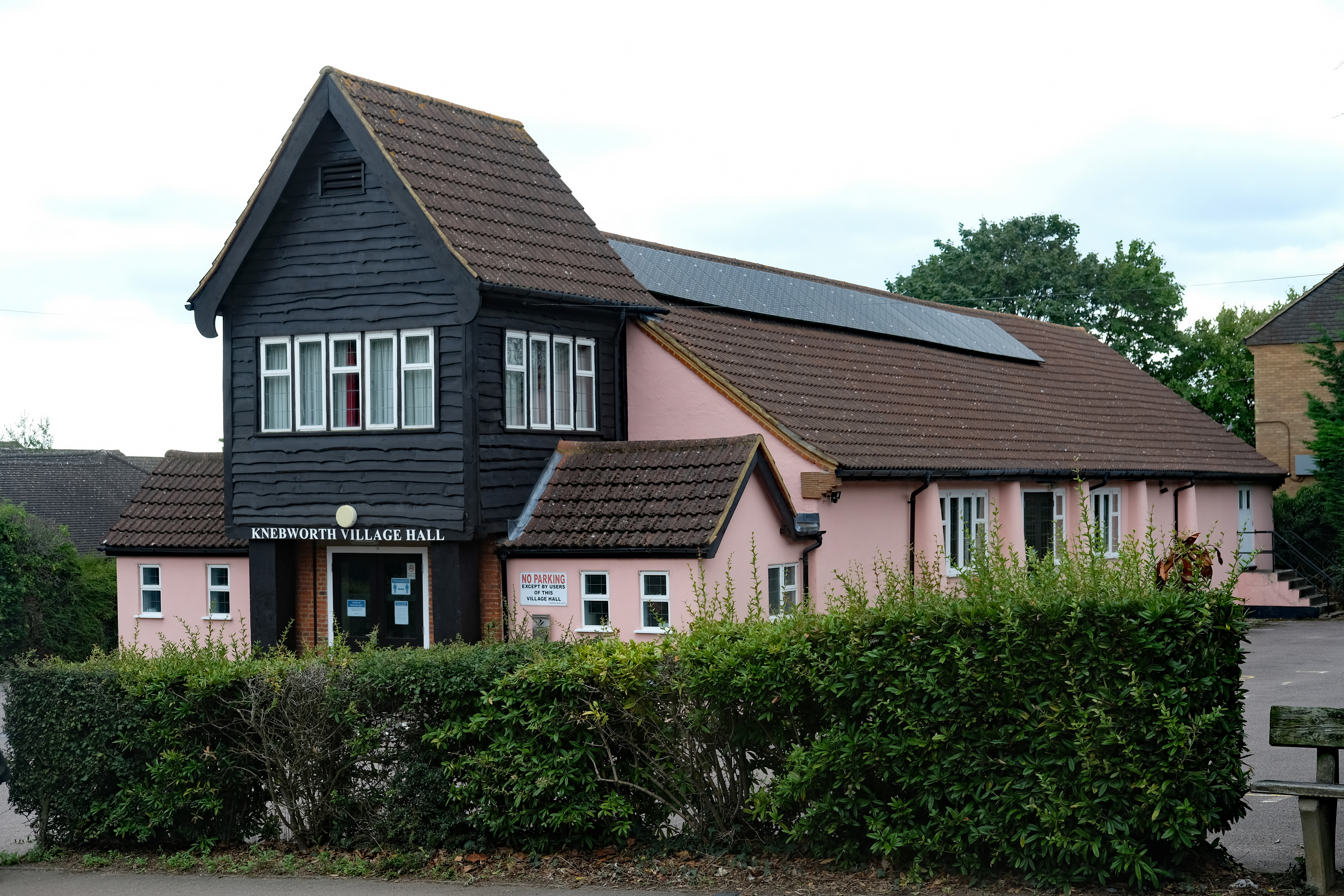
Knebworth Village Hall

There are three tiers of local government covering Knebworth, at parish, district, and county level: Knebworth Parish Council, North Hertfordshire District Council, and Hertfordshire County Council. The parish council generally meets at Knebworth Village Hall on Park Lane.

For national elections, Knebworth forms part of the Stevenage constituency.

== Twinning ==
On 16 June 1990 the village was twinned with the commune of Châtelaillon-Plage in France. In their own words, the Knebworth Twinning Association exists to "encourage friendships between schools, sports clubs and social groups in the two towns". The group organises social events throughout the year.

Knebworth is twinned with:

- Châtelaillon-Plage, France

== Facilities ==
- Knebworth Post Office
- Doctors Surgery
- Knebworth Village Hall
- Lytton Mausoleum

Education and leisure

- Knebworth Primary and Nursery school, Swangleys Lane
- Raja Tandoori, restaurant and takeaway, London Road
- The Roebuck Inn, its oldest public house (now in Stevenage), which dates back to 1420
- The Lytton Arms (public house in Old Knebworth), an early Victorian building
- The Station, a public house, built in 1883
- Recreation ground, incorporating football pitches, tennis courts, bowling green and children's play equipment

Places of worship

- St Martin's, Church of England, designed by Sir Edwin Lutyens and consecrated by the bishop of St Albans, Edgar Jacob, in 1915
- St Mary's, Church of England, parts of which date back to 1120, the traditional burial place of the Lytton family
- St Thomas More, Roman Catholic Church, built in 1962 having replaced a temporary church that had existed since 1935.
- Trinity Church, a Methodist Church and United Reformed Church local ecumenical partnership built in 1996 with roots in the village dating back to 1880

== Sport and leisure ==
Knebworth has a Non-League football club Knebworth F.C. who play at Knebworth Recreation Ground. Knebworth Tennis Club and Knebworth Bowls Club are also based at the Recreation Ground.

Knebworth Park Cricket Club play at their ground in Knebworth Park. Green Dragon Bowmen, an archery club, are also based in the Park.

== Nature reserve ==
Knebworth Woods is a Site of Special Scientific Interest.

== Transport ==
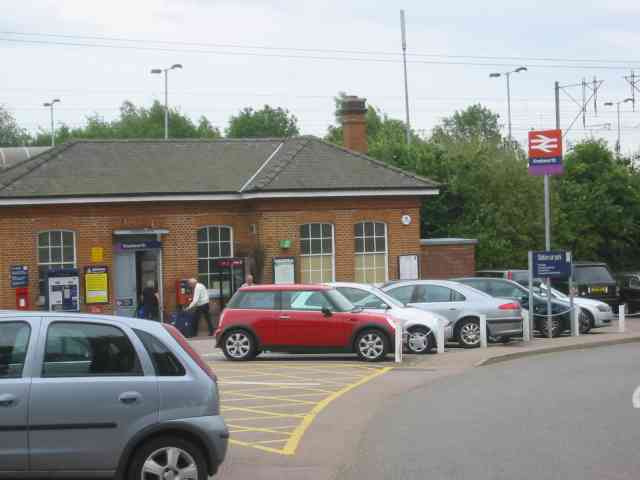
Knebworth railway station

Knebworth has a railway station, which has four platforms, running on the East Coast Main Line. Southbound services run towards London King's Cross while northbound services run towards Cambridge and Peterborough. The station and its train services are operated by Great Northern.

== Demography ==
At the 2021 census, the population of the parish was 4,538. The population had been 4,496 in 2011 Census.

== Notable inhabitants ==
- A. Duncan Carse, painter, of Deards End (1922–1923)
- Barbara Follett, politician
- David Ensor, British lawyer, actor, author and Labour Party politician
- David Lytton Cobbold, 2nd Baron Cobbold
- Chryssie Lytton Cobbold, Baroness Cobbold
- Denis Patrick O'Brien (1939–2023), English economist
- Earls of Lytton
- Edward Bulwer-Lytton
- Henry Lytton Cobbold, 3rd Baron Cobbold
- James Oswald (1710–1769), 18th-century composer
- Ken Follett, author
- Robert Wilson, MBE, founder of Music for Youth
- Tony Byworth, country music journalist

== Local publications ==
The Knebworth Parish News is published monthly and delivered to around 800 homes in Knebworth. It is published on paper only. Although it contains secular articles, the cost of production is underwritten by the Parochial Church Council, which has editorial control of the publication.

The Stevenage Comet is delivered to a small number of homes in the village.

== See also ==
- Concerts at Knebworth House
