= Lytton Mausoleum =

Mausoleum in Hertfordshire, England

Coordinates: 51°52′31″N 0°12′44″W

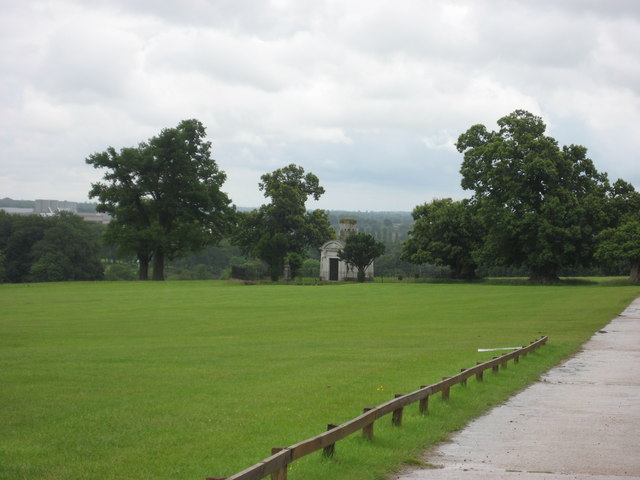
- The mausoleum in 2007
- Interactive map of the Lytton Mausoleum area

General information
- Architectural style: Neoclassical
- Location: England

Listed Building – Grade II
- Official name: Lytton Mausoleum in Knebworth Park, including railings
- Designated: 1968
- Reference no.: 1174579
- Client: Elizabeth Bulwer-Lytton

Technical details
- Structural system: stone

Design and construction
- Architect: John Buonarotti Papworth

The Lytton Mausoleum is a family mausoleum in Knebworth Park, Hertfordshire, England.

== Description ==
The mausoleum was commissioned by Elizabeth Bulwer-Lytton (née Warburton-Lytton) and built in 1817 in memory of her parents Richard Warburton-Lytton (1745–1810) and Elizabeth (née Jodrell) of Knebworth House. It is set in parkland at a distance from the Church of St Mary and St Thomas, a Grade I listed building.

Until the construction of the mausoleum, the Lytton family of Knebworth House used the Lytton Chapel, attached to the north side of St Mary's church, for interments. This chapel was rebuilt around 1710 to house three exceptionally fine monuments dedicated to members of the family.

== Burials ==
Inside the mausoleum are a number of coffins, including that of Elizabeth Bulwer-Lytton (1770–1843). A casket holds the ashes of Lady Constance Bulwer-Lytton (1869–1923). She joined the suffragette movement, and, as her epitaph states "sacrificed her health and talents in helping to bring victory to this cause".

== Architecture and conservation ==
The architect of the octagonal, stone building was John Buonarotti Papworth. His design is neoclassical. The roof supports a sarcophagus with shell acroteria.

The building and the railings which enclose it were Grade II listed in 1968.
