= Denis Patrick O'Brien =

English economist

Denis Patrick O'Brien, FBA (born 1939 in Knebworth, Hertfordshire, England, and died in 2023) was an English economist who worked in industrial economics and the history of economic thought.

O'Brien graduated in 1960 with a BSc (Economics) from University College London. From 1963 to 1972 he was Assistant Lecturer, Lecturer and then Reader in Economics at Queen's University Belfast. From 1972 to 1997 he was Professor of Economics at the University of Durham where he was Emeritus until his death in 2023.

== Honours ==
Denis O'Brien was elected to the Fellowship of the British Academy in 1988.

== Major publications ==
- Information Agreements, Competition and Efficiency (with D. Swann), 1969.
- J.R. McCulloch, A Study in Classical Economics, 1970.
- Competition in British Industry (with D. Swann, P. Maunder, W.S. Howe), 1974.
- The Classical Economists, 1975 (revised ed., 2004).
- Competition Policy, Profitability and Growth (with W.S. Howe, D.M. Wright, R.J. O'Brien), 1979.
- Authorship Puzzles in the History of Economics: A Statistical Approach (with A.C. Darnell), 1982.
- Lionel Robbins. MacMillan. January 1988. ISBN 9781349096855 – via Internet Archive.
- Thomas Joplin and Classical Economics, 1993.
- The Development of Monetary Economics: A Modern Perspective on Monetary Controversies, 2007.

Edited volumes:

- The Correspondence of Lord Overstone (3 vols.), 1971.
- Pioneers of Modern Economics in Britain (ed. and contrib., with J. Presley), 1981.
- Economic Analysis in Historical Perspective (with J. Creedy), 1984.
- Foundations of Monetary Economics (6 vols.), 1994.
- Collected Works of J.R. McCulloch (8 vols.)
- The Foundations of Business Cycle Theory (3 vols.), 1997.
- A History of Taxation, (8 vols.), 1999.

== Secondary sources ==
- Creedy, John (2001) - "D.P. O'Brien's contribution to the history of economic analysis", in Historians of Economics and Economic Thought. The Construction of Disciplinary Memory, ed. Steven G. Medema and Warren J. Samuels.
- M. Blaug (ed.) - Who's who in economics (3d edition), 1999.

== External reference ==
- Citation of Denis Patrick O'Brien as 2003 Distinguished Fellow of the History of Economics Society
- Works by or about Denis Patrick O'Brien at the Internet Archive
