= St Mary Magdalene's Church, Caldecote =

Coordinates: 52.0305°N 0.1989°W

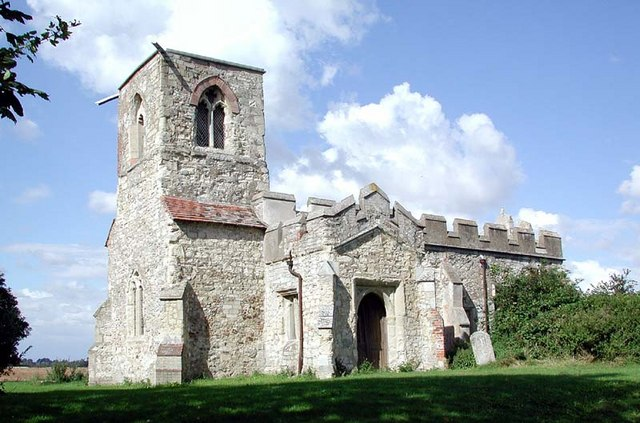
- St Mary Magdalene's Church, Caldecote, from the southwest

- Location in Hertfordshire
- OS grid reference: TL 2367 3843
- Location: Caldecote, Hertfordshire
- Country: England
- Denomination: Anglican
- Website: Friends of Friendless Churches

History
- Dedication: Mary Magdalene

Architecture
- Functional status: Redundant
- Heritage designation: Grade II*
- Designated: 27 May 1968
- Architectural type: Church
- Style: Gothic
- Groundbreaking: 14th century
- Completed: 15th century

Specifications
- Length: 51 feet (15.5 m)
- Width: 14 feet 6 inches (4.4 m)
- Materials: Flint and clunch rubble, with some brick

St Mary Magdalene's Church is a redundant Anglican church standing in the deserted medieval village of Caldecote, Hertfordshire, England. It is recorded in the National Heritage List for England as a designated Grade II* listed building, and is under the care of the Friends of Friendless Churches.

== History ==
The present church dates from the 14th and 15th centuries. It is likely that there was an earlier church on the site as the list of rectors begins in 1215. The village was abandoned mainly during the 15th and 16th centuries. Repairs were carried out to the church in the 18th century. The population then declined and the church was declared redundant in 1975. It was taken into the care of the charity, the Friends of Friendless Churches, in 1982. The charity holds the freehold with effect from 15 April 1982. In order to assist in the maintenance of the church, the Caldecote Church Friends was established in 2007.

In 2021, the church was attacked by vandals, bleach was poured on the altar, a fire extinguisher was emptied across the site and rocks were thrown through the 14th century windows.

== Architecture, fittings and furniture ==
St Mary's is constructed in flint and clunch rubble, with some brick. The clunch came from a nearby quarry at Ashwell. The brick was inserted to replace worn-away clunch. It is a small church with a nave and chancel without any division between them. It measures 51 feet (15.5 m) long by 14 feet 6 inches (4.4 m) wide. At the west end is a tower in two stages with corner buttresses in the lower part of the bottom stage. There are two-light windows dating from the 14th century in both stages and a plain parapet at the summit. On the east face of the tower is a lead plaque inscribed "Katherine Morris 1736", an unusual reference to a female plumber responsible for the lead covering on the roof. On the south of the church is a porch dating from the 15th century. The nave, chancel and porch have battlemented parapets. The windows in the nave and chancel are Perpendicular in style. Inside the porch is a crocketed and canopied stoup, which Nikolaus Pevsner states is unique. The font dates from the 15th century; it is octagonal with carved tracery, shields, and foliage, in "unusually rich" Perpendicular style. The benches also date from the 15th century, as does the circular east window. The memorials include a kneeling figure of Rector William Makesey who died in 1424. There is also a plaque to the memory of Thomas Inskip, 1st Viscount Caldecote.
