= Church of St Mary and St Thomas, Knebworth =

Coordinates: 51°52′27″N 0°12′48″W

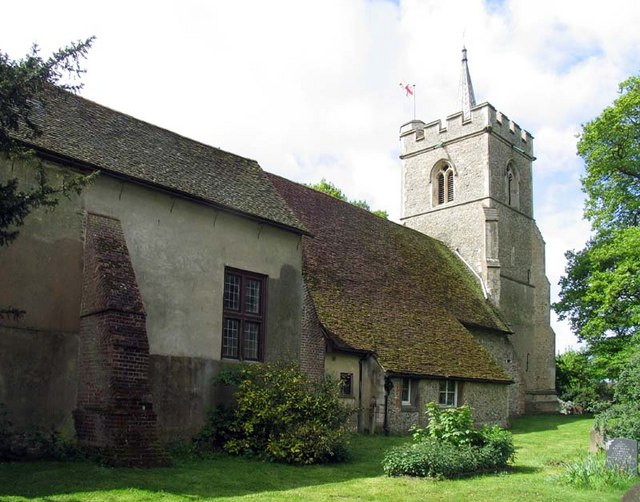
- The northern side of the church looking towards the tower
- Church of St Mary and St Thomas, Knebworth
- OS grid reference: TL 23085 21007
- Location: Knebworth Park, Knebworth, Hertfordshire, SG3 6PY
- Country: England
- Denomination: Church of England

History
- Status: Active

Architecture
- Functional status: Parish church
- Heritage designation: Grade I listed
- Designated: 27 May 1968

Administration
- Province: Canterbury
- Diocese: St Albans
- Archdeaconry: Hertford
- Deanery: Stevenage
- Parish: Knebworth

Clergy
- Rector: The Revd Charles King

The Church of St Mary and St Thomas is one of two Anglican churches in Knebworth, Hertfordshire, England. The church dates from the twelfth century and is a grade I listed building.

== History ==
=== Site ===
The church is set in a churchyard which in turn is surrounded by parkland. Like a number of Norman churches in the area (for example, St Nicholas' Church, Stevenage; All Saints, Datchworth), the site is on a hill. Archaeological investigations have identified traces of an early settlement between the church and Knebworth House. It is believed that the settlement was abandoned when the park was created in c. 1300.

In 1914 work started on a new church, St Martin's, on a site next to the Great North Road to serve what was by then the main population centre of Knebworth, but St Mary and St Thomas has remained in use.

== Architecture ==
The architectural historian Nikolaus Pevsner described the exterior of the church as "architecturally insignificant". The most prominent feature is the 15th-century tower, surmounted by a short spire typical of the region called a "Hertfordshire spike".(see note^{1})

Features of interest inside the church include a Norman chancel arch.

== Memorials ==
The church houses memorials to the Lytton family. Until the construction of the Lytton Mausoleum in Knebworth Park, the Lytton family used the Lytton Chapel for interments. The chapel is attached to the north side of the church and was rebuilt around 1710 to house three exceptionally fine monuments dedicated to members of the family.

The churchyard has several war graves and a listed tomb by Edwin Lutyens.

== Conservation ==
On 27 May 1968, the church was designated a grade I listed building. It is included in the Old Knebworth Conservation Area.

== Present day ==
Saints Mary and Thomas is part of the parish of Knebworth in the Archdeaconry of Hertford of the Diocese of St Albans. The church has tended towards a more traditional style of worship, using the Book of Common Prayer for its services.

== Notes ==
1.Flèche or short spire rising from a church-tower, its base concealed by a parapet, common in Herts., England. Pevsner, N., Cherry. BoE, Hertfordshire. (1977)
