= Caldecote, Hertfordshire =

Village and civil parish in Hertfordshire, England

Coordinates: 52.02°N 00.20°W

Caldecote
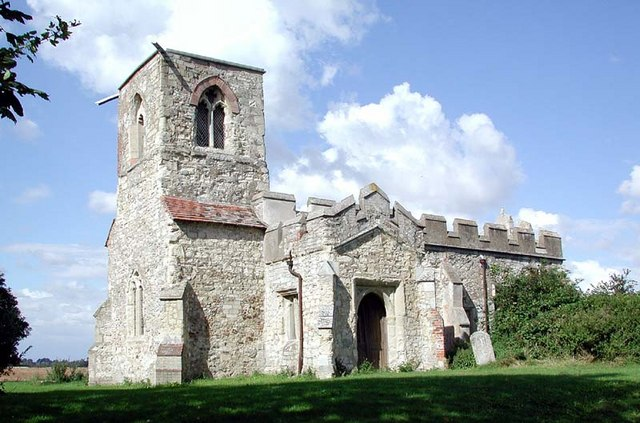
- St Mary Magdalene, Caldecote

- Location within Hertfordshire
- Population: 13 (Parish, 2021)
- OS grid reference: TL2338
- Civil parish: Caldecote
- District: North Hertfordshire
- Shire county: Hertfordshire
- Region: East
- Country: England
- Sovereign state: United Kingdom
- Post town: Baldock
- Postcode district: SG7
- Dialling code: 01462
- Police: Hertfordshire
- Fire: Hertfordshire
- Ambulance: East of England

Caldecote is a small village and civil parish in the North Hertfordshire district of Hertfordshire, England. It lies 3 miles (5 km) north of Baldock, its post town, and around a mile and a half east of Stotfold in the neighbouring county of Bedfordshire. The Great North Road (A1) passes just to the west of the village. At the 2021 census the parish had a population of 13.

== History ==
The village consists of a cluster of cottages around the redundant Church of St. Mary Magdalene, which dates from the 14th and 15th centuries and is in Perpendicular style. The church is currently in the care of the Friends of Friendless Churches charity.

To the south of the church is a manor house dating from the 14th century.

In the year 1724, several Roman urns, containing burnt bones and ashes, were discovered in this parish.

During the 1970s archaeological excavations were carried out for a number of summers under the direction of Professor Guy Beresford. These revealed that during the 12th and 13th centuries there were approximately nine crofts lying to the north of the church and possibly three others close to the northwest boundary of the present manor garden. The population declined heavily during the mid-14th century, mainly due to the Black Death; no subsidy was paid in 1428 indicating that by then there were fewer than ten householders. The excavations demonstrated that after the manor was granted to the Priory the lands of the peasantry were gradually amalgamated.

== Governance ==
There are three tiers of local government covering Caldecote, at parish, district, and county level: Caldecote and Newnham Parish Council, North Hertfordshire District Council, and Hertfordshire County Council. The parish council is a grouped parish council, also covering the neighbouring parish of Newnham.
