= Tony Byworth =

British journalist

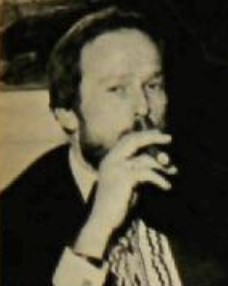
- Citizenship: British
- Known for: Country music journalism
- Awards: Country Music Association Wesley Rose Award (Foreign Media Achievement)

Tony Byworth is a British journalist.

== Career ==
Tony Byworth has been involved in country music for over 35 years, working initially as a country music journalist with columns in various publications and editing the consumer publication Country Music People. Working within the industry, he was creative manager for Acuff-Rose Music and, in 1983, founded Byworth-Wootton International.

In addition, he has written several books on country music and prolific album compiler and sleeve note writer. He is the recipient of several awards, including CMA (GB) Journalist Of The Year (1976 and '77)and the recipient of the Country Music Association’s prestigious Wesley Rose (Foreign Media Achievement) Award in 1993.

He lives in Knebworth, Hertfordshire though equally at home in the US - both in Nashville, Tennessee and Austin, Texas - where he has visited regularly over the years.

=== Industry activities ===
A founding member of the BCMA (British Country Music Association) consumer organisation in 1969, Tony Byworth was twice elected chairman of the trade CMA (Great Britain) in 1975 and 1976. He was creative manager at Acuff-Rose Music's London office (1974–76), appointed by Nashville chief Wesley Rose. In 1983 he founded Byworth-Wootton International (with Richard Wootton), a music services company working on behalf of American country music artists.

=== Journalist ===
Byworth edited the monthly magazine Country Music People for six years (1977–83), was a contributing editor for Billboard, Music Week and The Stage and TV Today, and provided columns for pop music publications (including Record Mirror and Sounds) throughout the 1970s and early 80s.

=== Byworth-Wootton International ===
In 1984, Tony co-founded Byworth-Wootton International with Richard Wootton, the UK's first country-music services company, which led to working with many top US artists and managements wanting to develop British careers.

Tony Byworth also provided PR services on behalf of Garth Brooks and George Strait as well as developing various country projects, including an internet site and the London-based country music radio station Ritz 1035.

The author of several books, numerous sleeve notes and album compilations,

== Awards ==
The Country Music Association's prestigious 'Wesley Rose (Foreign Media Achievement) Award' in 1993.

== Publications ==
- Byworth, Tony; Bob Allen (2007). The Billboard Illustrated Encyclopedia of Country. Exeter Books. ISBN 978-0-8230-7781-6.
- Byworth, Tony (1984). Giants of Country Music. Bison Books. ISBN 978-0-600-38584-4.
- Byworth, Tony (1991). Music Master Country Music Catalogue. Music Master / Bookwise International. ISBN 0-904520-57-9.
- Byworth, Tony (1993). Music Master Country Music Catalogue. Music Master / Waterlow Information Services. ISBN 0-904520-75-7.

== Sources ==
- Country Music
