= Edith Bulwer-Lytton, Countess of Lytton =

Wife of Edward Bulwer Lytton, later court-attendant

The Right Honourable The Countess of Lytton VA CI
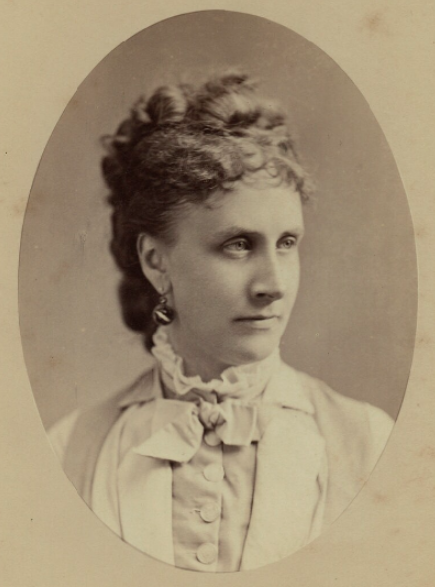
- The Countess of Lytton in 1876
- Born: Edith Villiers; 15 September 1841
- Died: 17 September 1936 (aged 95)
- Resting place: Knebworth, Hertfordshire, England
- Other names: Edith Bulwer-Lytton, Baroness of Lytton
- Known for: Vicereine of India
- Spouse: Robert Bulwer-Lytton, 1st Earl of Lytton (m. 1864; died 1891)
- Children: 7, including Victor and Constance
- Relatives: Villiers family

Edith Bulwer-Lytton, Countess of Lytton, VA, CI (née Villiers; 15 September 1841 – 17 September 1936) was a British aristocrat. As the wife of Robert Bulwer-Lytton, 1st Earl of Lytton, she was vicereine of India. After his death, she was a court-attendant of Queen Victoria. Her children included suffragette Constance Bulwer-Lytton.

== Life ==
Edith Villiers was born on 15 September 1841, into the aristocratic Villiers family. She was the daughter of Edward Ernest Villiers (1806–1843) and Elizabeth Charlotte Liddell. She was the granddaughter of George Villiers, and the niece of George Villiers, 4th Earl of Clarendon. The Pre-Raphaelite portrait of her by George Frederic Watts was painted when she was 21.

She was by then the only unmarried daughter as her twin sister Elizabeth had married Henry Loch, 1st Baron Loch in 1862. (There is a tale that Henry proposed to the wrong girl by mistake and then refused to admit it.) Edith was living with her widowed mother at the home of her uncle, the Earl of Clarendon. She had been trained in dancing, music and art, but she had not received a structured education.

Villiers married Robert Bulwer-Lytton (later 1st Earl of Lytton) on 4 October 1864. She brought her new husband an income of £6,000 per year. Robert, an aspiring diplomat, was relatively poor for a member of the British upper classes, although his father Edward Bulwer-Lytton was a well-known writer and was raised to the peerage in 1866. His father controlled his son and it was his choice for his son to become a diplomat. Having previously broken up a match between Robert and another girl, he also disapproved of the marriage to Edith. For the first year he refused to speak to her but eventually warmed to the marriage.

Edith accompanied her husband during his diplomatic career, and several of their children were born abroad. The children were:

- Edward Rowland John Bulwer-Lytton (1865–1871)
- Lady Elizabeth Edith "Betty" Bulwer-Lytton (12 June 1867 – 28 March 1942) who married Gerald Balfour, 2nd Earl of Balfour
- Lady Constance Georgina Bulwer-Lytton, born at Vienna (1869–1923), British suffragette activist.
- Hon. Henry Meredith Edward Bulwer-Lytton (1872–1874)
- Lady Emily Bulwer-Lytton (1874–1964) who married the architect Edwin Lutyens.
- Victor Bulwer-Lytton, 2nd Earl of Lytton, (1876–1947)
- Neville Bulwer-Lytton, 3rd Earl of Lytton (6 February 1879 – 9 February 1951)

== Vicereine of India ==
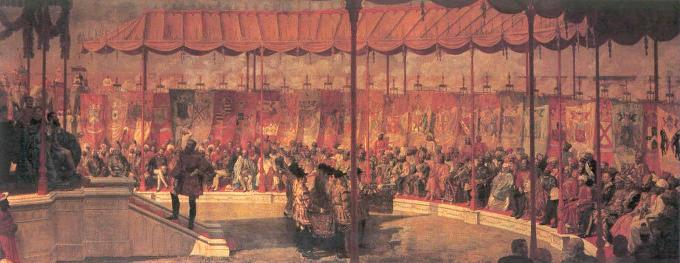
The Delhi Durbar of 1877. The Viceroy of India is seated on the dais to the left.

Her husband served as Viceroy of India between 1876 and 1880. Edith was thus Vicereine. In 1876 she gave birth at Shimla to her son Victor. He was the third of her sons but Edward and Henry had died as infants in 1871 and 1874. Victor and her last child Neville who was born in 1879 would in time inherit the Earldom.

The Delhi Durbar of 1877 was held beginning on 1 January 1877 to proclaim Queen Victoria as Empress of India. The following year Edith, as Vicereine, was invested in the Imperial Order of the Crown of India. Edith was also decorated with the honorific Lady, Royal Order of Victoria and Albert. Edith and her daughters restyled the court which they considered inferior to the courts of Europe. Fashions were ordered from Paris. Edith was noted for her support of the education of women in India. Her daughter Emily retained an interest in Indian culture after the family's return to England and was converted to theosophy. When Edith's husband resigned in 1880 he was made an Earl by Benjamin Disraeli.

== Paris ==
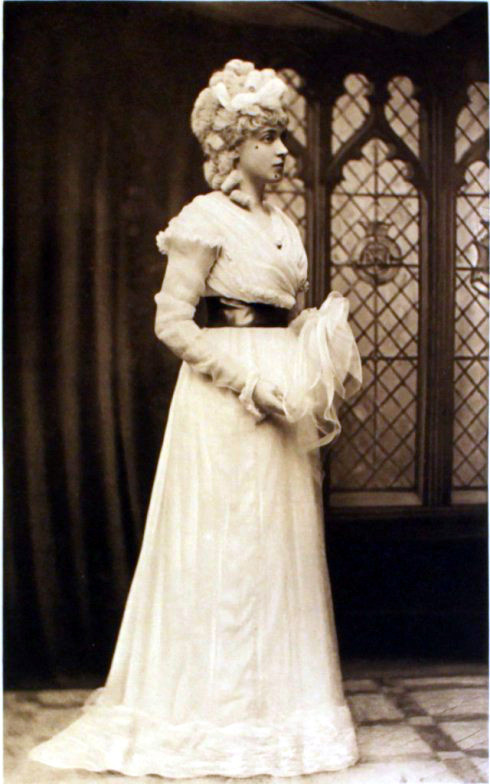
Lady Edith Villiers dressed as Lady Melbourne for a costume party at Devonshire House (1897)

Edith's husband became the British Ambassador in Paris in 1887 although he was weakened by heart disease. He seemed to make a good impression as when he died suddenly in Paris in 1891 he was given, unusually, a state funeral in France. Edith was the chief mourner along with her surviving five children. The funeral was attended by ministers of state and the French government arranged for 3,500 soldiers to serve at the funeral, before his body was taken by rail to England.

== At court ==
Edith had a much reduced income. She became Queen Victoria's Lady-in-Waiting (Lady of the Bedchamber) in 1895 taking the post left vacant by Susanna, Duchess of Roxburghe. She was asked personally by the Queen and she received £300 per year and served with eight other aristocratic maids of honour. In 1897, she was one of the guests at the Duchess of Devonshire's Diamond Jubilee Costume Ball on 2 July 1897.

When the Queen died, Edith rode with the body on the funeral journey from London to Windsor. She then held the office of "Lady of the Bedchamber" to Queen Alexandra until she retired in 1905.

== Retirement ==
Her retirement lasted more than thirty years. She lived at Homewood, a dower house on the family estate at Knebworth, Hertfordshire. The house was designed circa 1901 by her son-in-law Sir Edwin Lutyens, in Arts and Crafts style. Her daughter Constance suffered a stroke in 1912 and returned to live at Homewood, remaining there until shortly before her death in 1923.

== Bibliography ==
Her granddaughter Mary Lutyens published a book Lady Lytton's Court Diary, based on Edith's experiences at the court of Queen Victoria. Mary's other publications include The Lyttons in India: An account of Lord Lytton's Viceroyalty, 1876–1880. Another granddaughter, Elisabeth Lutyens, mentioned Edith's life at Homewood when recalling her own childhood in her autobiography A Goldfish Bowl (1972).

== Legacy ==
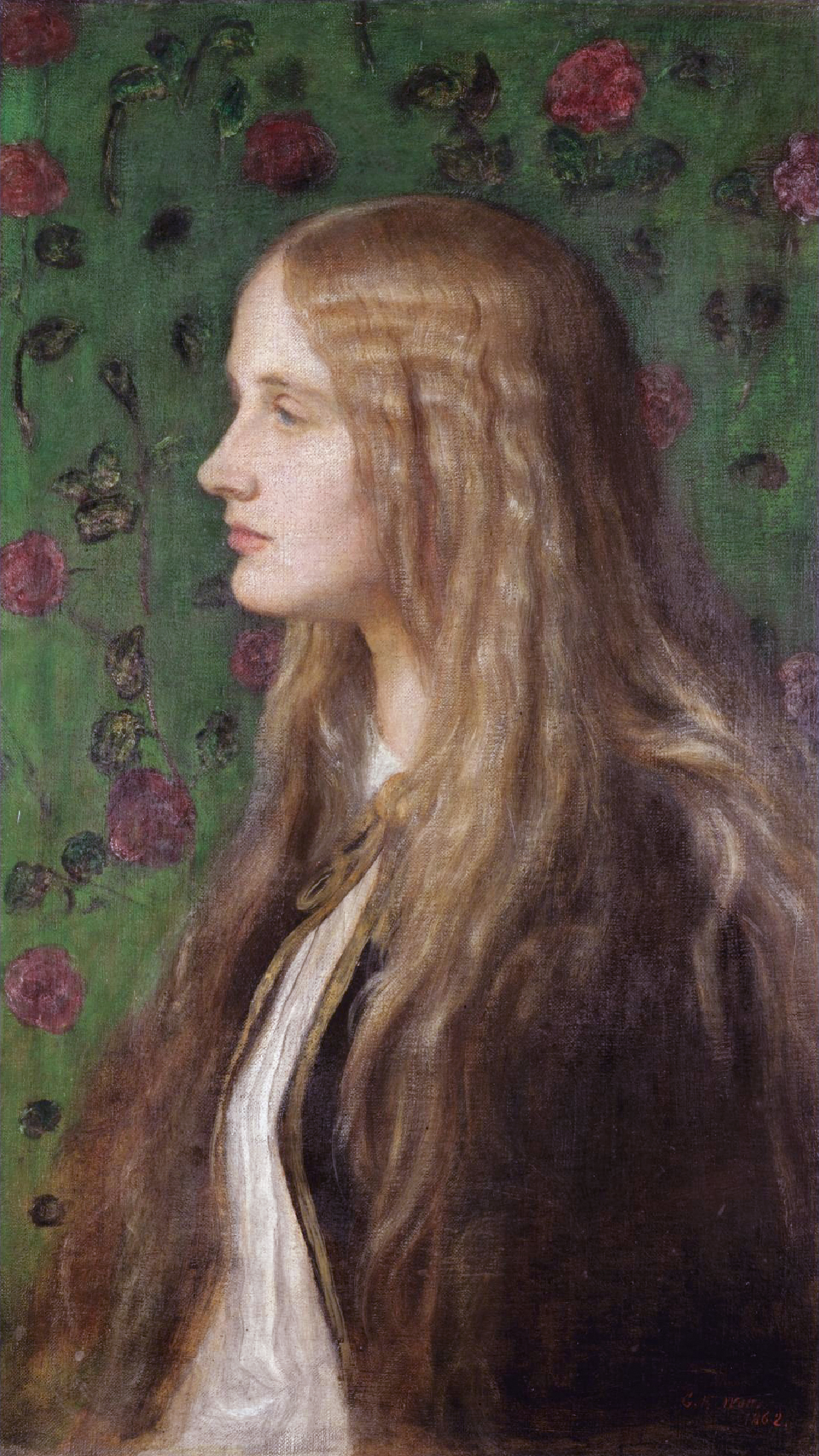
Portrait by George Frederic Watts (1862)

Edith and Robert had five children, who led influential lives. She also sat for the noted painting by George Frederic Watts. Some have deprecated her contribution as she had no formal education and her husband's biographers have thought her lightweight.
