= Homewood, Knebworth =

Country house in Knebworth, Hertfordshire, England

Coordinates: 51°51′48″N 0°12′09″W

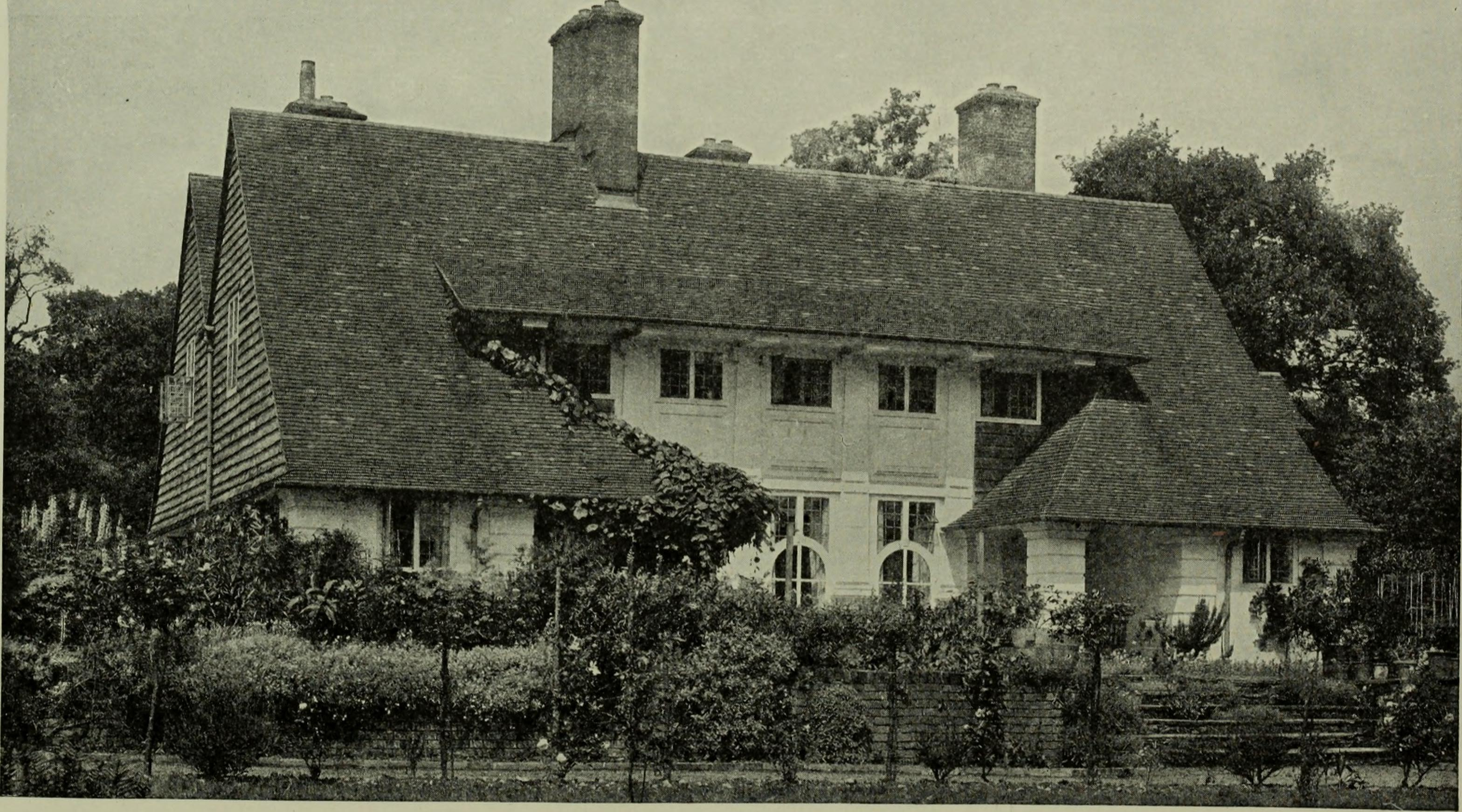
Homewood, garden front, showing the cutaway roof revealing a classical facade (1921)

Homewood is an Arts and Crafts style country house in Knebworth, Hertfordshire, England. Designed and built by architect Edwin Lutyens around 1900–3, using a mixture of vernacular and Neo-Georgian architecture, it is a Grade II* listed building. The house was one of Lutyens' first experiments in the addition of classical features to his previously vernacular style, and the introduction of symmetry into his plans. The gardens, also designed by Lutyens, are Grade II listed in the National Register of Historic Parks and Gardens.

== House ==
Lutyens designed the house for his mother-in-law, Edith Bulwer-Lytton, the dowager countess of Lytton, and her daughter, the suffragette Constance Lytton. It was built at the southern end of Park Wood on the Lyttons' Knebworth estate, about 1 kilometre (0.62 miles) southeast of Knebworth House, using whitewashed brick, weatherboarding and plain tiles. Construction was carried out by the estate builders, to a tight budget. Sources differ on the dates, ranging from 1900, to 1903.

The house's square plan, measuring 100 feet wide by 98 feet deep, has been compared to Philip Webb's earlier design for Joldwynds, in Surrey. The northwest, entrance front with its three gables is very like that of Joldwynds. The southwest, side elevation has only two gables, however. The southeast, garden front differs radically from Webb. The roof is cut away in the centre to reveal a two-storey, classical facade with Ionic pilasters, creating the appearance of an embedded villa, emerging from the vernacular covering of tiled roofs and elm weatherboarding, which elsewhere around the house come down to the tops of the ground floor windows. The garden front is flanked by two loggias facing each other across a terrace. Other classical touches, on the house's entrance front, include a central, rusticated porch, which has been called Mannerist, and two flanking small pavilions with rusticated piers. The western pavilion contained a darkroom, and the northern one a larder and scullery. There is a small extension on the northeast, service side of the house. The lower part of the house brickwork is painted in a cream colour

The interior is classical, with the rooms laid out compactly on a grid of three by three units. At the centre is a large, well-lit staircase. The centre of the garden front is occupied by the dining room, with three large french windows leading onto the terrace. It appears these windows were much admired by Winston Churchill, on his visits to Knebworth. So much so, that in 1928, when he enlarged Chartwell in Kent, he asked his architect, Philip Tilden, to copy these three windows, but in a more square dining room, to fit a round table. From the entrance front, the porch is entered via an arched open doorway which Lutyens surmounted with an open, unglazed tympanum. White painted quoins are used both in the doorway and in the loggias. This leads into a long passage, with two font doors, as at, Greywalls, Gullane, Lothian, built the same year. The glazed door on the right giving access to the vestibule. This arrangement produced draughts and helped to make the house cold in the winter; Edith's bedroom gained the nickname "Vladivostok". The house only had one bathroom.

After her ordeals in Holloway Prison, Constance's failing health led to a stroke in 1912, and she spent the rest of her life at Homewood with her mother. She died in 1923, only days after moving out of Homewood to a flat in Paddington, London, in an attempt to restart an active life.

The composer Elisabeth Lutyens CBE spent many holidays here with her grandmother, and wrote about Homewood in her autobiography, "A Goldfish Bowl" (pub Cassel 1972) as a "delicious house" P5.

Sir Edwin Lutyens visited on 15 September 1931 and was photographed kneeling in the garden in front of his seated mother in law, the Dowager Countess, on her 90th birthday, which she shared with her twin sister, Lady Loch. Lutyens' wife, Lady Emily Lutyens, and the Dowager Countess of Balfour, (the former Betty Bulwer-Lytton), were also present.

When Edith died in 1936, the house passed to her son Victor Bulwer-Lytton and in 1947 to his daughter, Hermione Cobbold. In the early 1970s, the Pollock-Hill family bought the house. They have restored it, mostly following Lutyens' plans, but have added some bathrooms.

== Garden ==
Beyond the house's southeast front with its stone-flagged terrace are yew hedges and flowerbeds, and a lower area of lawn below a retaining wall. There are views to the southeast over farmland towards distant hills. Beyond the southwest elevation is another lawned area and a raised croquet lawn.
