= Knebworth House =

Country house in Hertfordshire, England

General information
- Type: Country house
- Architectural style: Tudor Gothic
- Location: Knebworth, Hertfordshire, England
- Coordinates: 51.7718°N 0.2006°W
- Construction started: 15th century
- Owner: Henry Lytton Cobbold, 3rd Baron Cobbold

Website
- knebworthhouse.com

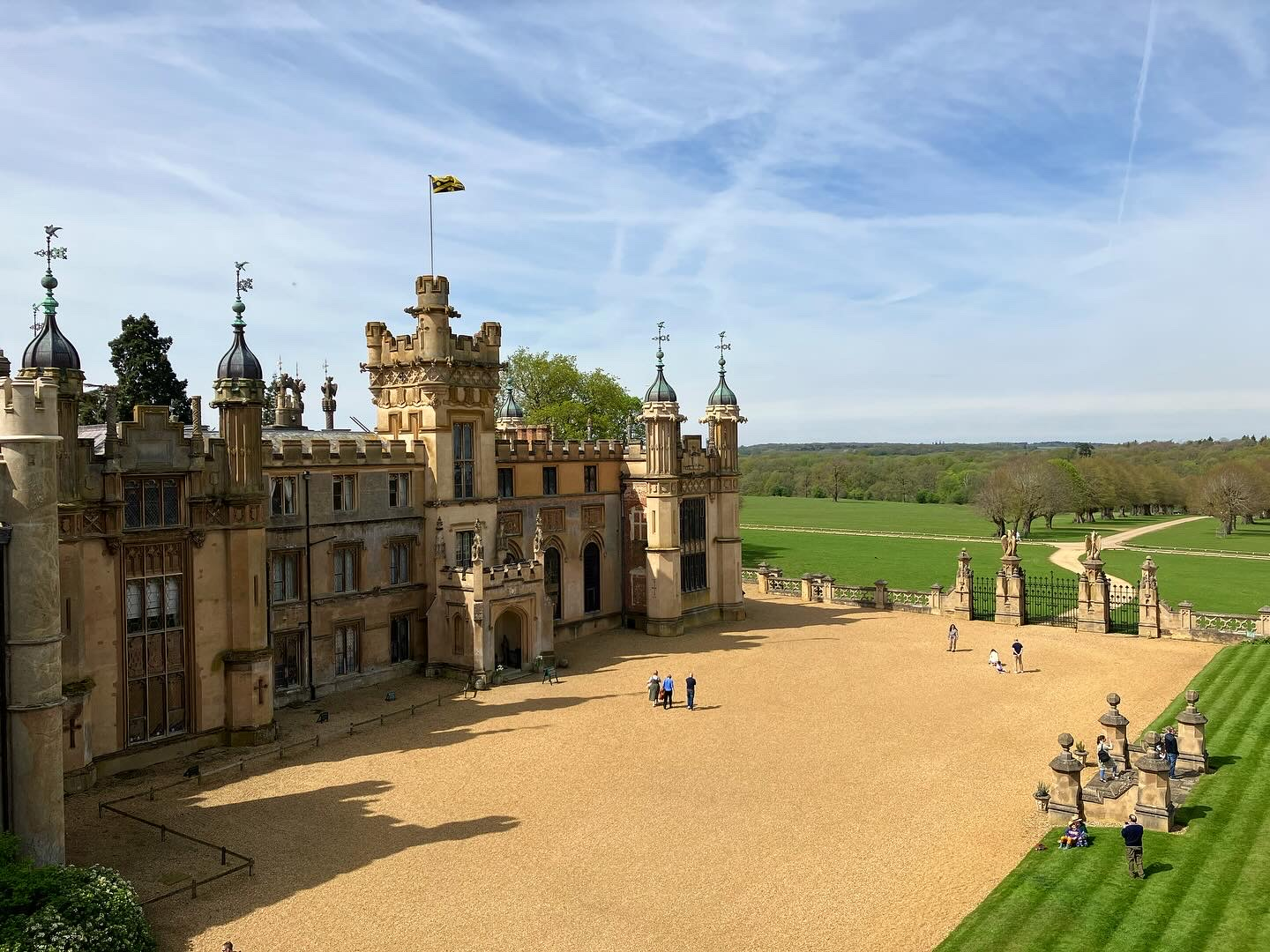
View of the house in 2024

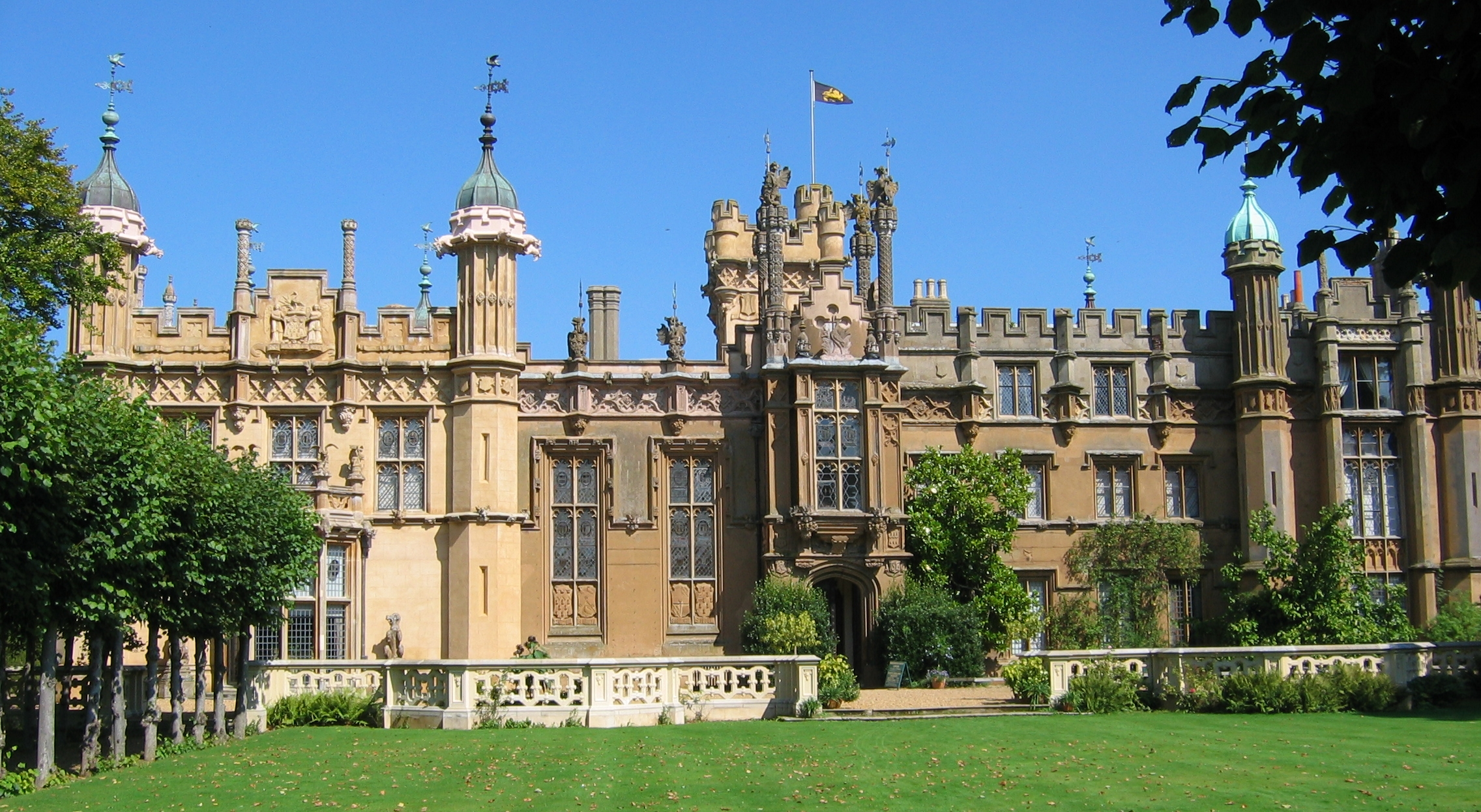
Knebworth House in 2007

Knebworth House is an English country house in the parish of Knebworth in Hertfordshire, England. It is a Grade II* listed building. Its gardens are also listed Grade II* on the Register of Historic Parks and Gardens. In its surrounding park are the medieval St. Mary's Church and the Lytton family mausoleum. It was the seat of the Earl of Lytton (also Viscount Knebworth) and is now the house of the family of the Baron Cobbold of Knebworth. The grounds are home to the Knebworth Festival, a recurring open-air rock and pop concert held since 1974.

== History ==
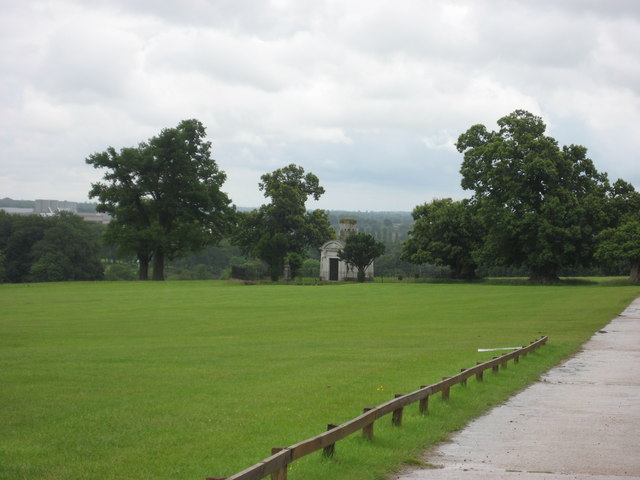
Lytton Mausoleum in June 2007

The home of the Lytton family since 1490, when Thomas Bourchier sold the reversion of the manor to Sir Robert Lytton, Knebworth House was originally a red-brick Late Gothic manor house, built round a central court as an open square. In 1813–16 the house was reduced to its west wing, which was remodelled in a Tudor Gothic style by John Biagio Rebecca for Mrs Bulwer-Lytton, and then was transformed in 1843-45 by Henry Edward Kendall Jr. into the present Tudor Gothic structure.

Knebworth's most famous resident was Edward Bulwer-Lytton (1803–1873), the Victorian author, dramatist and statesman, who embellished the gardens in a formal Italianate fashion. The 1st Baron's great-grandson Neville (1879–1951) married Judith Blunt, a well known horse breeder who inherited Crabbet Arabian Stud in 1917 and devoted her life to it. In 1913–1914 the house was leased for £3,000 per year by Grand Duke Michael Alexandrovich of Russia and his morganatic wife Natalia Brasova.

Much of the interior of Knebworth House was redesigned by Sir Edwin Lutyens, who married Lady Emily Bulwer-Lytton (1874–1964) – he simplified the main parterre. Lady Emily was the daughter of the 1st Earl of Lytton, who served as Viceroy of India between 1876 and 1880. A herb garden, with an interlaced quincunx design, was drawn by Gertrude Jekyll in 1907, although not planted until 1982. Victor Lytton and his wife Pamela, lived at Knebworth from 1908 until his death in 1947 when the house was inherited by their daughter, Hermione Cobbold. She recalls time at Knebworth in an interview given to Brian Harrison as part of the Suffrage Interviews project, titled Oral evidence on the suffragette and suffragist movements: the Brian Harrison interviews. The grounds are also open to the public.

The 3rd Baron Cobbold lives at the house with his family. After a career in the film industry in Los Angeles, he lets production companies film on location in the house and gardens. The grounds include tourist attractions such as an adventure playground and dinosaur park and host various events including classic car rallies and an annual Christmas Fair.

== Music festival ==
Beginning in 1974, a recurring open-air rock and pop concert known as the Knebworth Festival has been held in the grounds. The festival first occurred in July 1974 when the Allman Brothers Band, the Doobie Brothers and other artists played to an audience of 60,000 people. Over the years the festival has featured major artists such as Pink Floyd, the Rolling Stones, Led Zeppelin, Lynyrd Skynyrd, Queen (their 1986 concert at the venue was their last with Freddie Mercury), Paul McCartney, Phil Collins, Genesis, Mike Oldfield, the Beach Boys, Deep Purple, Iron Maiden, Metallica, Eric Clapton, Elton John, Dire Straits, Red Hot Chili Peppers, Robbie Williams, Oasis, and Liam Gallagher.

== Media ==
=== Films and television ===
Productions that have been filmed at Knebworth include:

- Anastasia (1956) – palace of the Empress
- Danger Man – "The Sanctuary" (1959)
- The Champions – "The Night People" (1967)
- The Avengers – "Invasion of the Earthmen" (1967/68)
- Decline and Fall... of a Birdwatcher (1968)
- Randall and Hopkirk (Deceased) – "Somebody Just Walked Over My Grave" (1969)
- Carry On Henry - Exterior shots (1970)
- The Persuaders! - opening credits (1970/71)
- The Adventurer – "Action!" (1972)
- Horror Hospital (1973)
- Keep It Up Downstairs (1976) – filmed entirely on location as the fictitious 'Cockshute Towers'
- Beauty and the Beast (1976) - served as the castle of the Beast, along with Sudeley Castle and Salisbury Hall
- The Big Sleep (1978) – General Sternwood's country mansion
- The Great Muppet Caper (1981) – exterior of the Mallory Gallery
- Sir Henry at Rawlinson End (1980) – interior and exterior
- The Shooting Party (1985) – filmed entirely on location
- Haunted Honeymoon (1986) – exterior of the home
- Porterhouse Blue (1987) – interior and exterior of the home of Sir Cathcart D'Eath
- The Lair of the White Worm (1988) – exterior of the D'Ampton mansion
- Batman (1989) – exterior and some interior scenes of Bruce Wayne's manor
- Knebworth – the Event 1990 (1990) – a benefit concert held in aid of Nordoff-Robbins Music Therapy by winners of the Silver Clef Award, attended by 120,000 people. Performers included: Cliff Richard & the Shadows, Robert Plant & Jimmy Page, Elton John, Phil Collins, Dire Straits, Status Quo, Tears for Fears, Paul McCartney, Genesis, and was headlined by Pink Floyd. The performances have been released on many formats since.
- Lovejoy (1991) Series 2 Episode 4 ("Montezumas Revenge")
- A Bit of Fry & Laurie – Season Four, Episode 6 ("The Duke of Northhampton") (1995) - sketch
- The Canterville Ghost (1996)
- Jane Eyre (1997) – Thornfield Hall
- Sacred Flesh (1999) – exterior scenes of the convent
- The Mummy Returns (2001) - exterior shots of the O'Connell family home
- Harry Potter and the Philosopher's Stone (2001) - the house was used in several pieces of promotional material for the film, and hosted the film's international launch, though no parts of the house were used in shooting of the film itself.
- 28 Days Later (2002)
- Agent Cody Banks 2: Destination London (2004) – some scenes in and around the grounds
- Foyle's War Series 3 Episode 2 ("Enemy Fire") (2004) – as the fictional Digby Manor
- Match Point (2005)
- The Queen (2006)
- St Trinian's 2: The Legend of Fritton's Gold (2009) – used as the St. Trinian's all girl school
- Jonathan Creek – provided the location of Metropolis (2008 Christmas Special)
- The King's Speech (2010) – Balmoral Party and other scenes
- Agatha Christie's Marple (2010) – significant interior and exterior scenes, including in Season 1, Episode 3, "4.50 from Paddington," with Knebworth House and estate standing in for the fictional Rutherford Hall
- A Closed Book (2010) – released as Blind Revenge in the United States
- The Hour (2011) – Lord Elms residence
- The Scapegoat (2012) – significant interior and exterior scenes
- Midsomer Murders Series 15 Episode 1 ("The Dark Rider") – significant exterior scenes
- Woman Like Me (2018 music video) – Little Mix
- Eurovision Song Contest: The Story of Fire Saga (2020) – exterior shots of Alexander Lemtov's British house
- Meerkat Music Presents: Little Mix Uncancelled (2020 Virtual Concert)
- The Nevers (Season 1 Episodes 3 and 4) (2021–) – exterior scenes
- Knebworth 1996 – Oasis: Knebworth 1996 (2021) – Concert Documentary surrounding Oasis' record-breaking 1996 concerts at Knebworth Park. Also released as a live album
- You (season 4) – American psychological thriller television series
- The Crown - Interiors used as Balmoral Castle
- The Flash (2023) – Exterior of Wayne Manor
- The Gentlemen (2024) – Season 1 Episode 4: 'Dorset Hall', home to the 8th Lord Bassington

=== Radio ===
Local radio station BOB FM (now Heart Hertfordshire) broadcast from Knebworth's former pump house, which used to provide water to the main house.

== See also ==
- Homewood, Knebworth, the dower house
