= Pennsylvania State Hospitals =

Hospital system in Pennsylvania, United States

The Pennsylvania State Hospital System is a network of psychiatric hospitals operated by the Commonwealth of Pennsylvania. At its peak in the late 1940s the system operated more than twenty hospitals and served over 43,000 patients. As of 2011 fewer than nine sites remain in use, and many of those serve far fewer patients than they once did. Many facilities or portions of facilities no longer in use for psychiatric treatment have been repurposed to other uses, while some have been demolished.

The first facility in the Pennsylvania State Hospital system, Harrisburg State Hospital, opened in 1845 and from its inception was tasked with providing care for mentally ill persons throughout the Commonwealth of Pennsylvania. Many facilities within the system were state-operated from the start, while some initially operated as county poor farms, county hospitals, or other institutions.

As the number of institutionalized mentally ill dwindled many state hospitals have been, in whole or in part, converted to other uses. Many have remained state-operated facilities, such as office building repurposed as correctional centers. A few former state hospitals have been demolished.

Western Center was also a state facility for the mentally disabled, and was located in Canonsburg, Washington County, Pennsylvania. It consisted of multiple buildings. It closed in the late 1980s or early 1990s. Southpoint (a commercial development) now sits on the site that was once Western Center.

== Plans ==
Most state hospitals consisted of a number of individual buildings spread across an often rural "campus." Most can be characterized as falling into one of several "plans" or designs.

=== Kirkbride Plan ===
The Kirkbride Plan refers to a system of mental asylum design advocated by Philadelphia psychiatrist Thomas Story Kirkbride in the mid-19th century. Kirkbride developed his requirements based on a philosophy of Moral Treatment. The typical floor plan, with long rambling wings arranged "en echelon" (staggered, so each connected building still received sunlight and fresh air), was meant to promote privacy and comfort for patients. The building form itself was meant to have a curative effect. These asylums tended to become large, imposing, Victorian-era institutional buildings within extensive surrounding grounds which often included farmland. By 1900 the notion of "building-as-cure" was largely discredited, and in the following decades these facilities became too expensive to maintain.

=== Cottage plan ===
By the middle of the nineteenth century, some doctors complained that large monolithic asylums had not lived up to their expectations. However, psychiatrists did not immediately abandon their belief in the therapeutic environment; instead, they argued for a different therapeutic environment. Clinging to a belief that architecture influenced human conduct, they proposed smaller cottage-like structures to replace the Kirkbride-plan hospitals. These cottages were to be arranged in a village, an homage to the Belgian town of Gheel, where citizens looked after mentally ill people who for centuries gathered there to worship at the shrine of St. Dymphna, the patron saint of lunatics.

== List of Pennsylvania State Hospitals ==
Hospital	Location	Opened	Peak population	Peak year	Current population	Status	Plans	Notes
Allentown State Hospital	Allentown	1912	2012	1950	n/a	Demolished 2020	Payton	
Clarks Summit State Hospital	Scranton	1938	1046	1947		active	Cottage	originated in 1862 as a poor farm
Danville State Hospital	Danville	1872	2916	1947	163 (2008)	active	Kirkbride	
Dixmont State Hospital	Emsworth	1862	973	1947	n/a	closed 1984, demolished 2006	Kirkbride	
Eastern Pennsylvania Psychiatric Institute	Philadelphia				n/a	closed 1981	Cottage	
Embreeville State Hospital	Embreeville	1898	1017	1955	n/a	closed 1980, Demolished 2022	Cottage	originated as county poor house
Farview State Hospital	Waymart	c 1912	1096	1947		repurposed		now a correctional facility
Harrisburg State Hospital	Harrisburg	1851	2441	1947	n/a	closed 2006, demolished 2025/2026	Kirkbride, Cottage	
Haverford State Hospital	Haverford	c 1964	562	1987	n/a	closed 1998 demolished 2008	Cottage	
Hollidaysburg State Hospital	Hollidaysburg	1938	369	1947	n/a	closed 1979	Cottage	originally opened in 1904 as Blair County Hospital for Mental Diseases
Lawrence Frick State Hospital	Cresson	1916				closed 1984, repurposed	Cottage	now a correctional facility
Marcy State Hospital	Pittsburgh	1915				closed 1982	Cottage	
Mayview State Hospital	Pittsburgh	1938	3785	1967	n/a	closed 2008. demolished 2012	cottage	began in 1892 as
Norristown State Hospital	Norristown	1880	4954	1947		active	Echelon	
Philadelphia State Hospital	Philadelphia	1907	7000+	1960	n/a	closed 1990. demolished 2006	Cottage	
Polk State School	Polk	1897			n/a	closed 2023.		HABS PA-6746
Retreat State Hospital	Newport Township	1938	1103	1947	n/a	closed 1980, repurposed	Cottage	began in 1878 as a poor house later converted to a correctional facility that closed in June 2020.
Scranton State Hospital	Scranton				n/a	closed, demolished 1991	single building	
Somerset State Hospital	Somerset	1938	463	1947	n/a	closed	cottage	Began as county poor farm. Is now converted to a Correctional facility
South Mountain Restoration Center	Mont Alto	1907	1100	1970		active	cottage	also known as Samuel G. Dixon State Hospital
Torrance State Hospital	Derry Township	1919	3300	1950s	229 (2008)	active	Cottage	
Warren State Hospital	Warren	1880	2562	1947		active	Kirkbride	
Wernersville State Hospital	Wernersville	1891	1851	1947		active	Cottage	
Western Psychiatric Institute of Pittsburgh	Pittsburgh			Was never a custodial "state hospital" but a freestanding Psychiatric Hospital and was and still is an acute care setting affiliated with Pitt for years prior to becoming part of UPMC		repurposed	single building	Now part of the University of Pittsburgh Medical Center
Woodville State Hospital	Carnegie	1854	3200		n/a	closed 1992, demolished	Cottage	

=== Pennsylvania State General Hospitals ===
During the late 1800s, the State built many hospitals for coal miners in Pennsylvania, which were also referred to as State Hospitals for Miners. These were not built as psychiatric facilities, but rather as general medical hospitals. In 1985, Pennsylvania began the transfer of these hospitals from state ownership into private or community facilities. As of 1992, all had been divested from state ownership.

== State Hospitals for Miners ==
- Ashland State General Hospital - divested from state in 1990, renamed Saint Catherine Medical Center Fountain Springs
- Blossburg State General Hospital - closed by state in 1972 before divestitures began
- Coaldale State General Hospital - divested from state in 1992, renamed St. Luke's Miners Memorial Hospital, maintained as part of the St. Luke's University Health Network
- Connellsville State General Hospital - divested from state in 1985, renamed Highlands Hospital and Health Center
- Hazleton State General Hospital - divested from state in 1986, renamed Hazleton General Hospital
- Nanticoke State General Hospital - divested from state in 1990, renamed Mercy Special Care Hospital of Nanticoke
- Philipsburg State General Hospital - divested from state in 1991, private until 2006, closed 2007 due to bankruptcy, to be demolished
- Punxsutawney State General Hospital
- Scranton State General Hospital - closed by state in 1988 due to no merger partner found for divesture
- Shamokin State General Hospital - divested from state in 1992, renamed Shamokin Area Community Hospital; As of 2012, renamed Geisinger-Shamokin Area Community Hospital, a campus of Geisinger Medical Center; maintained as part of the Geisinger Health System
