= Allentown State Hospital =

Former hospital in Pennsylvania, United States

- Pennsylvania State Hospitals
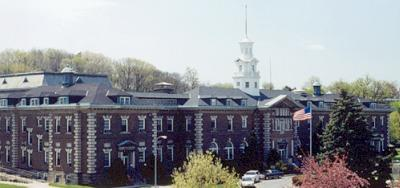
- Allentown State Hospital in October 2007

Geography
- Location: 1600 Hanover Ave., Allentown, Pennsylvania, U.S., Pennsylvania, United States
- Coordinates: 40.615°N 75.430°W

Organization
- Care system: Public
- Type: Mental Health

Services
- Beds: 210

History
- Founded: Oct. 3, 1912
- Closed: Dec. 17, 2010
- Demolished: Started: Dec. 28, 2020 Competed: 2021

Links
- Lists: Hospitals in Pennsylvania

Allentown State Hospital was a psychiatric hospital located at 1600 Hanover Avenue in Allentown, Pennsylvania. It served Lehigh, Northampton, Carbon, Monroe, Pike, and occasionally eastern Schuylkill counties in the Lehigh Valley and Northeastern regions of Pennsylvania.

The hospital, which was one of seven psychiatric hospitals in Pennsylvania, was mostly demolished on December 28, 2020, though two buildings of the hospital remain. Those buildings currently house the nerve center for Community Services for Children, an organization responsible for the local Head Start and Early Head Start programs to support children throughout Pennsylvania.

== History ==
=== 20th century ===
Planning for the development of Allentown State Hospital began in 1901. Eleven years later, on October 3, 1912, it opened. The hospital cost $1,931,270 to build (over $65,000,000 adjusted for inflation as of June 2026). The hospital's patient population peaked in 1950 with 2,012 patients.

In November 1998, Allentown State Hospital was the first psychiatric hospital in the United States to be completely seclusion-free. Due in part to community mental health efforts, the hospital's occupancy later fell to as low as 175 patients.

=== 21st century ===
Due to the sharp decline in the need for psychiatric hospitals, the Pennsylvania Department of Public Welfare closed the hospital. Some residents were transferred to Wernersville State Hospital in Berks County. Others were placed in residential care settings in the community. The hospital closed on December 17, 2010.

The Pennsylvania Department of General Services placed bids to demolish all the buildings on the property, including the historic main building, by the end of 2019. The property was purchased for the purpose of demolition by TCA Properties in Doylestown.

== In popular culture ==
Parts of the 2019 movie Glass were filmed at Allentown State Hospital and other Allentown locations.

== See also ==
- List of historic places in Allentown, Pennsylvania
