= Wernersville State Hospital =

Coordinates: 40.331°N 76.107°W

- Pennsylvania Department of Human Services
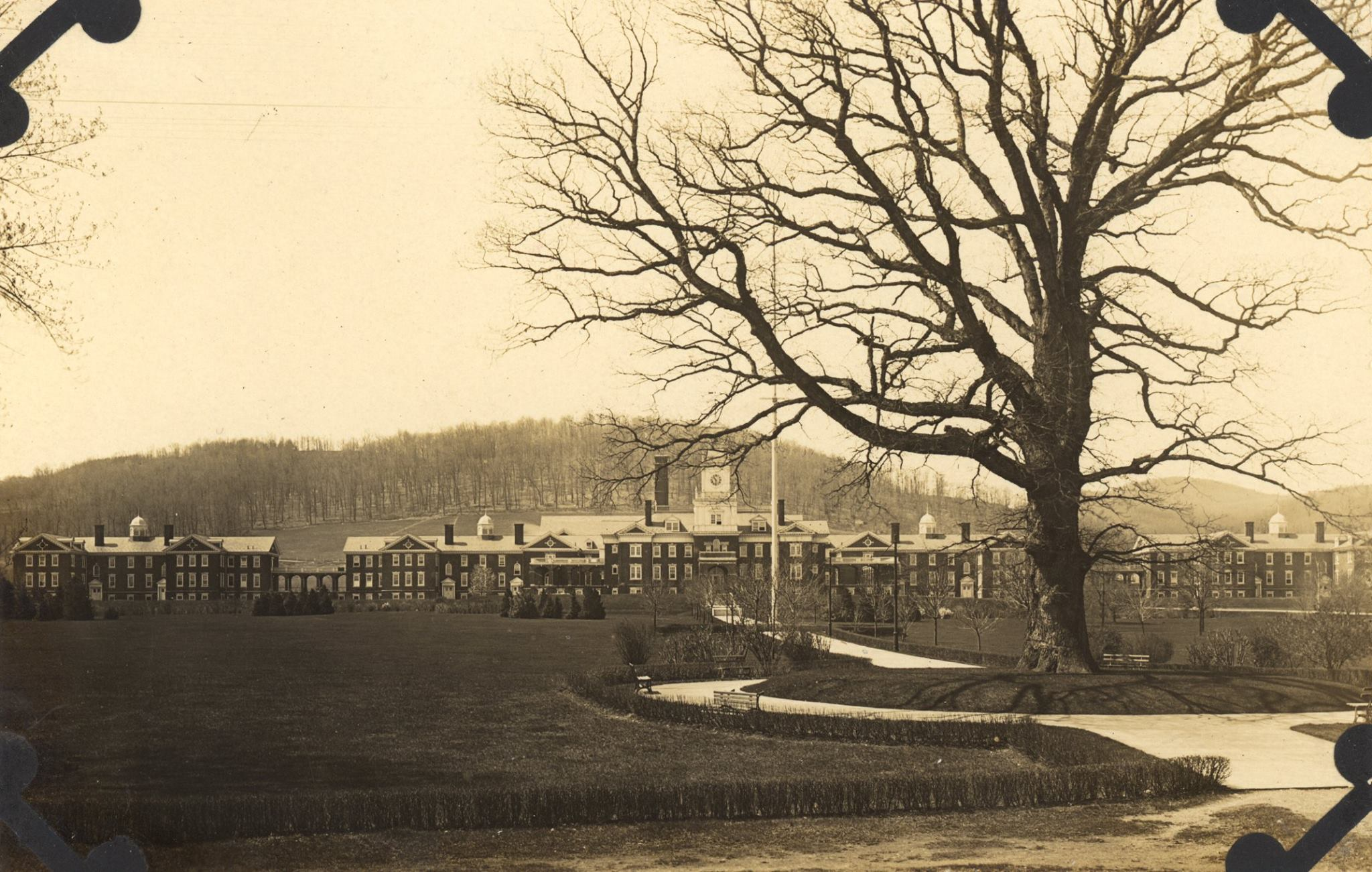

Geography
- Location: Wernersville, Berks County, Pennsylvania, United States

Organization
- Care system: Public Mental Health
- Type: Mental Health

Services
- Emergency department: No

Helipads
- Helipad: No

History
- Founded: 1891

Links
- Lists: Hospitals in Pennsylvania
- Other links: State Hospitals in Pennsylvania

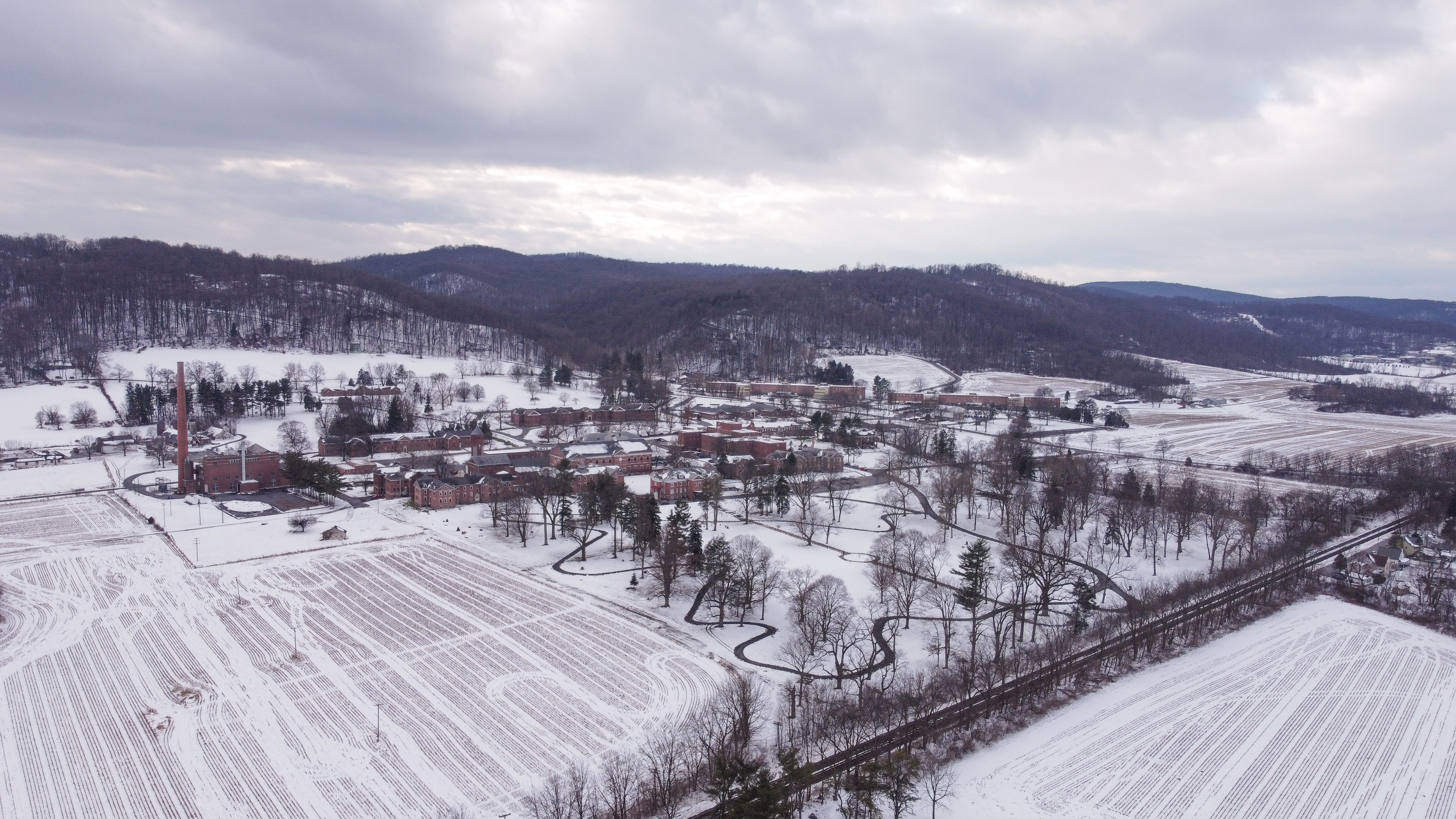
Wernersville State Hospital in South Heidelberg Township, Pennsylvania

Wernersville State Hospital, founded in 1891 as the State Asylum for the Chronic Insane, is one of six state hospitals in the Commonwealth of Pennsylvania. The hospital is operated by the Pennsylvania Department of Human Services' Office of Mental Health and Substance Abuse Services (OMHSAS).

== Location ==
Wernersville State Hospital is located in the Appalachian hills of rural Berks County about 15 miles from Reading in South Heidelberg.
