= Elise Mercur =

American architect (1864–1947)

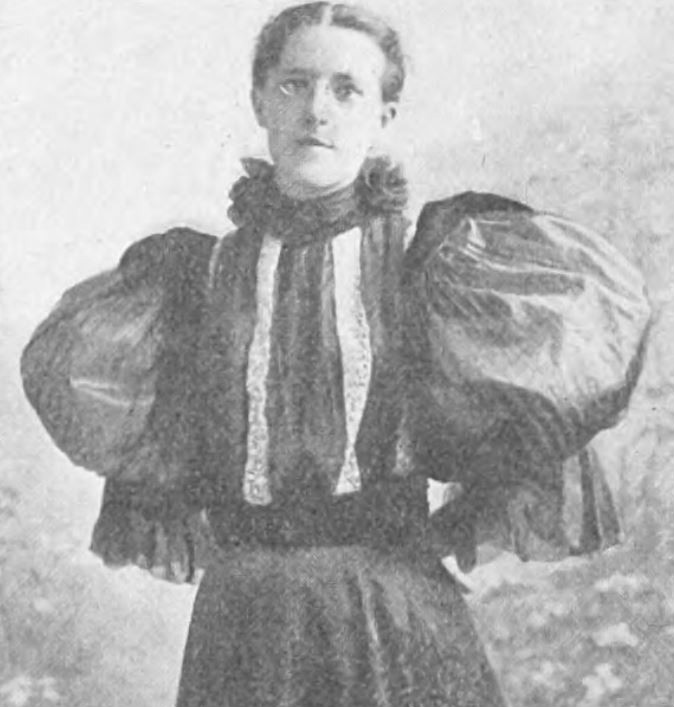
- Mercur, 1896
- Born: November 30, 1864; Towanda, Pennsylvania, U.S.
- Died: March 27, 1947 (aged 82); Sewickley, Pennsylvania, U.S.
- Other name: Elise Mercur Wagner
- Occupation: Architect
- Years active: 1890–1905
- Notable work: The Women's Building, Cotton States and International Exposition (1895)
- Spouse: Karl Rudolph Wagner
- Children: 1

Elise Mercur, also known as Elise Mercur Wagner (November 30, 1864 – March 27, 1947), was Pittsburgh, Pennsylvania's first female architect. She was raised in a prominent family and educated abroad in France and Germany before completing training as an architect at the Pennsylvania Academy of the Fine Arts. Her first major commission, for the design of the Woman's Building for the Cotton States and International Exposition of Atlanta, was secured in 1894, while she was apprenticed to Thomas Boyd. It was the first time a woman had headed an architectural project in the South. After completing a six-year internship, she opened her own practice in 1896, where she focused on designing private homes and public buildings, such as churches, hospitals, schools, and buildings for organizations like the YMCA/YWCA.

Mercur was a popular lecturer and not only designed, but supervised the construction of her projects. In 1897, she designed the Marshalsea Poor Farm hospital for children in Bridgeville, Pennsylvania and her design of the Washington Female Seminary building led by contractor Clara Meade was completed in 1898. Before she retired in 1905, Mercur designed over a dozen projects, many of which have since been demolished. St. Paul Episcopal Church (1896) at 2601 Center Avenue in the Hill District of Pittsburgh, designed by Mercur, was recognized by the Pittsburgh History & Landmarks Foundation as a historic landmark.

== Early life and education ==
Elise Mercur was born November 30, 1864 (Note: The earliest primary records for Mercur consistently give her birth in 1864. After she married her younger husband, records show varying years, i.e. Marriage license gives November 30, 1866, the 1900 census gives November 1869, the 1910 – 1930 censuses show 1871, and the 1940 census shows 1875.) in Towanda, Bradford County, Pennsylvania, to Anna Hubbard (née Jewett) (1832–1901) and Mahlon Clark Mercur (1916–1905). Her mother was a poet from Bolton, Massachusetts, and her father, from Bradford County, was a prominent Pittsburgh banker, businessman, and councilman. She had five siblings: Robert Jewett (1854–1929), Helen (1854–1929), Annie E., William H., and Hiram (1861–1918) and a half-brother, Mahlon, from her father's first marriage. She was the niece of Ulysses Mercur, Chief Justice of Pennsylvania Supreme Court Chief Justice (1883–1888). Mercur was educated in France and in Stuttgart, Germany, where she studied art, mathematics, languages, and music, becoming fluent in French and German. She returned to the United States where she studied design at the Pennsylvania Academy of the Fine Arts for three years.

== Architecture career ==
In 1890, Mercur began to work as a technical illustrator, and was promoted within a year to construction foreman in the Pittsburgh office of a prominent Pittsburgh architect, Thomas Boyd. In 1894, she competed against 13 other women architects in the design of the Woman's Building for the Cotton States and International Exposition to be held in Atlanta. In a unanimous decision, for her first major commission, she was awarded the $100 prize. After completing a six-year apprenticeship with Boyd, she opened her own architectural practice in 1896 in the Pittsburgh Westinghouse Building, where she was commissioned to design homes throughout western Pennsylvania. That year, she became a founding member of Pittsburgh's Architectural Club at Twentieth Century Club of Lansdowne, serving as the organization's first treasurer. A popular lecturer, Mercur delivered talks on a range of architectural topics, including construction processes, sanitation, and ventilation, at various clubs and educational facilities like the Pratt Institute School of Architecture of Brooklyn.

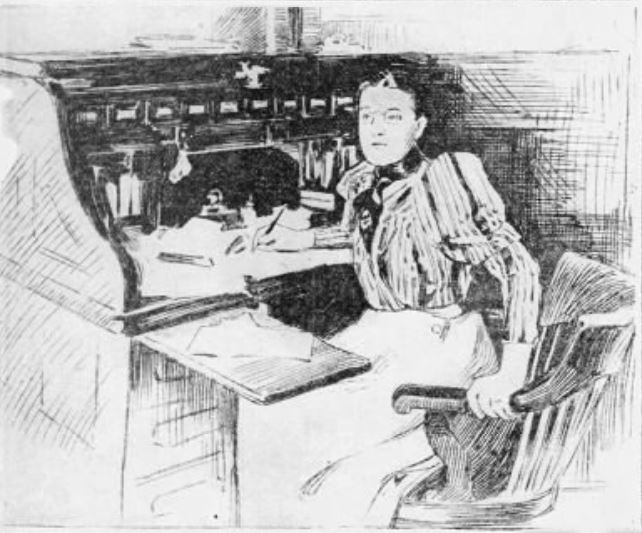
Sketch of Mercur in 1898 from the New York World

Mercur, who was primarily commissioned to design public buildings and private homes, advertised her architectural plans in the Sunday edition of the Pittsburgh Post. In 1897, she was hired by the City of Pittsburgh to make plans and specifications for the Department of Charities for the design of the Children's Building to be erected at City Home and Hospital, Marshalsea. That year, she was also hired to add a new wing to the Washington Female Seminary on Lincoln Street in Washington, Pennsylvania. In 1898, Mercur moved her practice to the Times Building on 4th Avenue in Pittsburgh, where she employed three draughtsmen to assist with her work. On October 1 she married Karl Rudolph Wagner (1872–1949), a German immigrant living in Economy, Pennsylvania. The couple were married in the home of Mercur's brother and services were officiated by the rector Robert Maddington Grange of the Church of the Ascension.

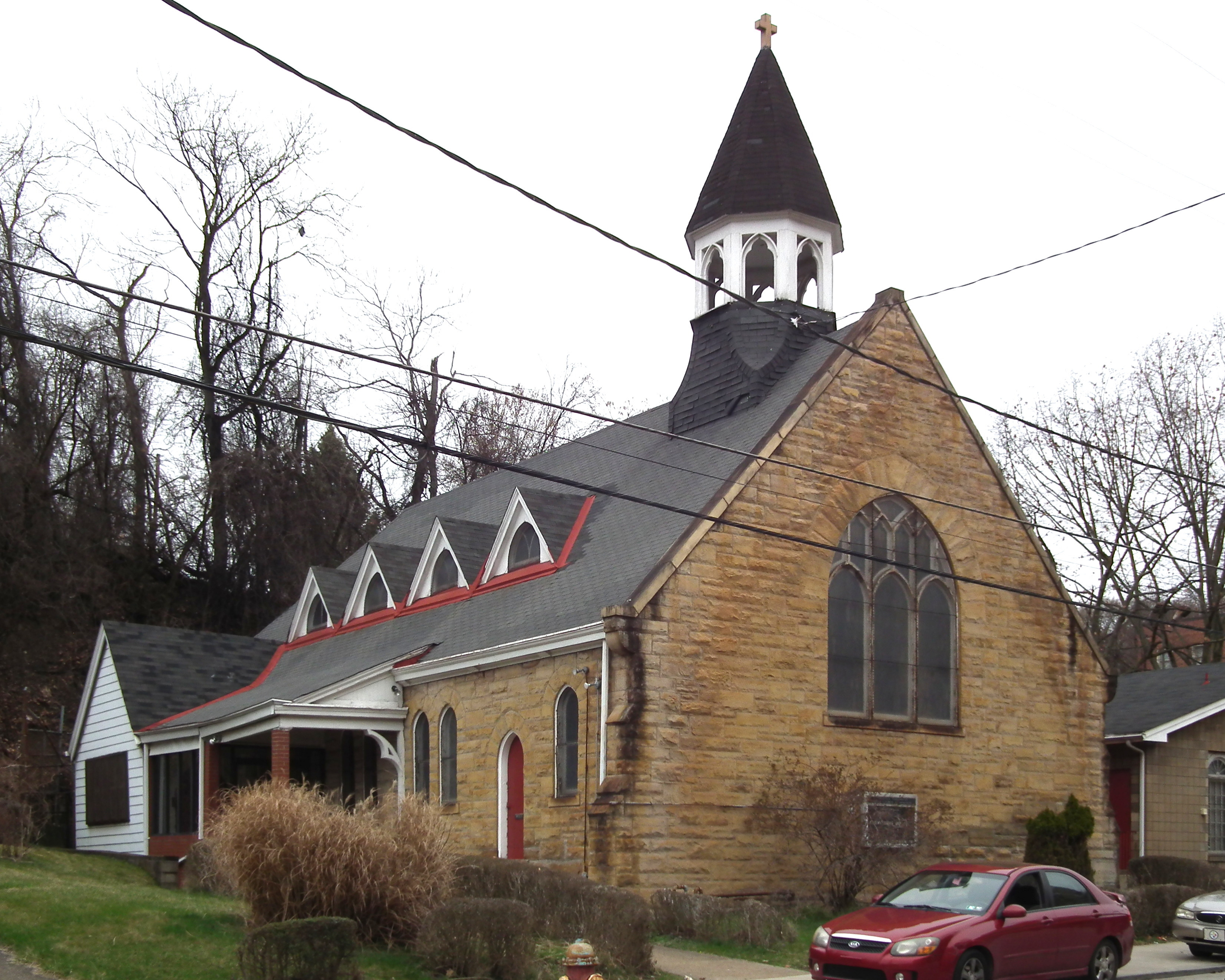
St. Paul’s Episcopal Church, Hill District, Pittsburgh, built in 1896

Of her decision to work in the male-dominated field of architecture, Mercur stated in an interview with The New York World that after her father had lost his fortune and died, she did not want to be dependent on her family. She also noted that she demanded and was paid the same fees that male architects received for their work. The April 1898 issue of Home Monthly praised her attention to detail and noted her habit of living near the construction site to ensure she could properly supervise the building project. It introduced Mercur to readers in her role as an architect on the job at a construction site:

She goes out herself to oversee the construction of the buildings she designs, inspecting the laying of foundations and personally directing the different workmen from the first stone laid to the last nail driven, thereby acquiring a practical knowledge not possessed by every male architect.

In 1899, Wagner was listed on the Interstate Architects and Builders list of "Leading Architects in the Seven States" and she became known as the first woman architect to bring suit in the Pittsburgh Common Court for Pleas to recover architects fees. She moved her office to Economy in 1900, and began remodeling a home in Old Economy Village for herself and her husband. In 1904, Wagner built a private home and two schools in Economy. She retired the following year, after injuring her back in an accident.

== Later life and legacy ==
The Wagners' only child, (Note: The 1910 census lists an adopted daughter from Hungary, Adele Ribist, age 12, who does not appear in subsequent records.) Johannes Eberhardt Wagner, known as Hans, was born on October 2, 1912 and served in the US Army during World War II. In 1924, Wagner published a history of the towns of Old Economy Village and Ambridge Pennsylvania for the Harmony Society's centennial celebrations. She died on March 26 or 27, 1947 in Sewickley Valley Hospital in Sewickley, Pennsylvania, and was buried in the Economy Cemetery on Ridge Road, Ambridge, Pennsylvania.

Mercur (Wagner) is recognized as a pioneering woman architect, who made significant contributions in the Pittsburgh area. The Pittsburgh History & Landmarks Foundation calls her "the region's first woman architect". She is best known for her design of the Women's Building for the Cotton States Exhibition in 1895. Her design plans for the dome of the structure which were still being used in construction guidelines over a decade later. In 2007, the building she designed in 1896 as St. Paul's Episcopal Church was designated as a historic landmark by the Pittsburgh History & Landmarks Foundation. It is now Christian Tabernacle Kodesh Church of Immanuel and is located at 2601 Centre Avenue, Pittsburgh.

== Major works ==
=== Woman's Building ===
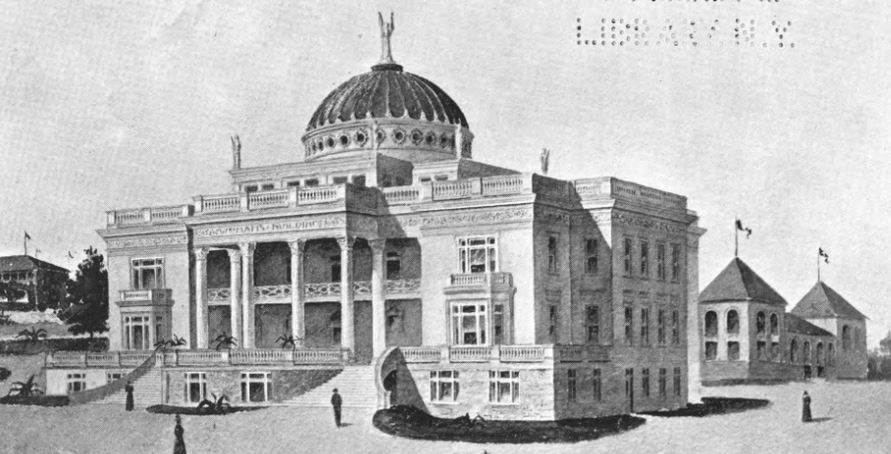
Woman's Building 1895 Cotton States and International Exposition, by Mercur

In 1894, Mercur entered a design competition for the 1895 International Exposition in Atlanta, Georgia. In a unanimous decision, she was awarded the commission over 13 other entries. Her selection proved beneficial for the planners, as she was able to secure structural materials from Carnegie Steel Company. Her proposal included a plastered, two-story frame building over a finished basement of brick and iron adorned with a tin roof topped by a dome. The building was to have four staircases, one of which gave access to the roof. It also contained men's and women's lavatories in the basement, a kindergarten area, fireplaces in each room, and a kitchen with a restaurant. When news of her win was announced, it marked the first time that a woman's design was selected for any major building project in the South. Minor modifications to her original plans were made during construction to remain within budget.

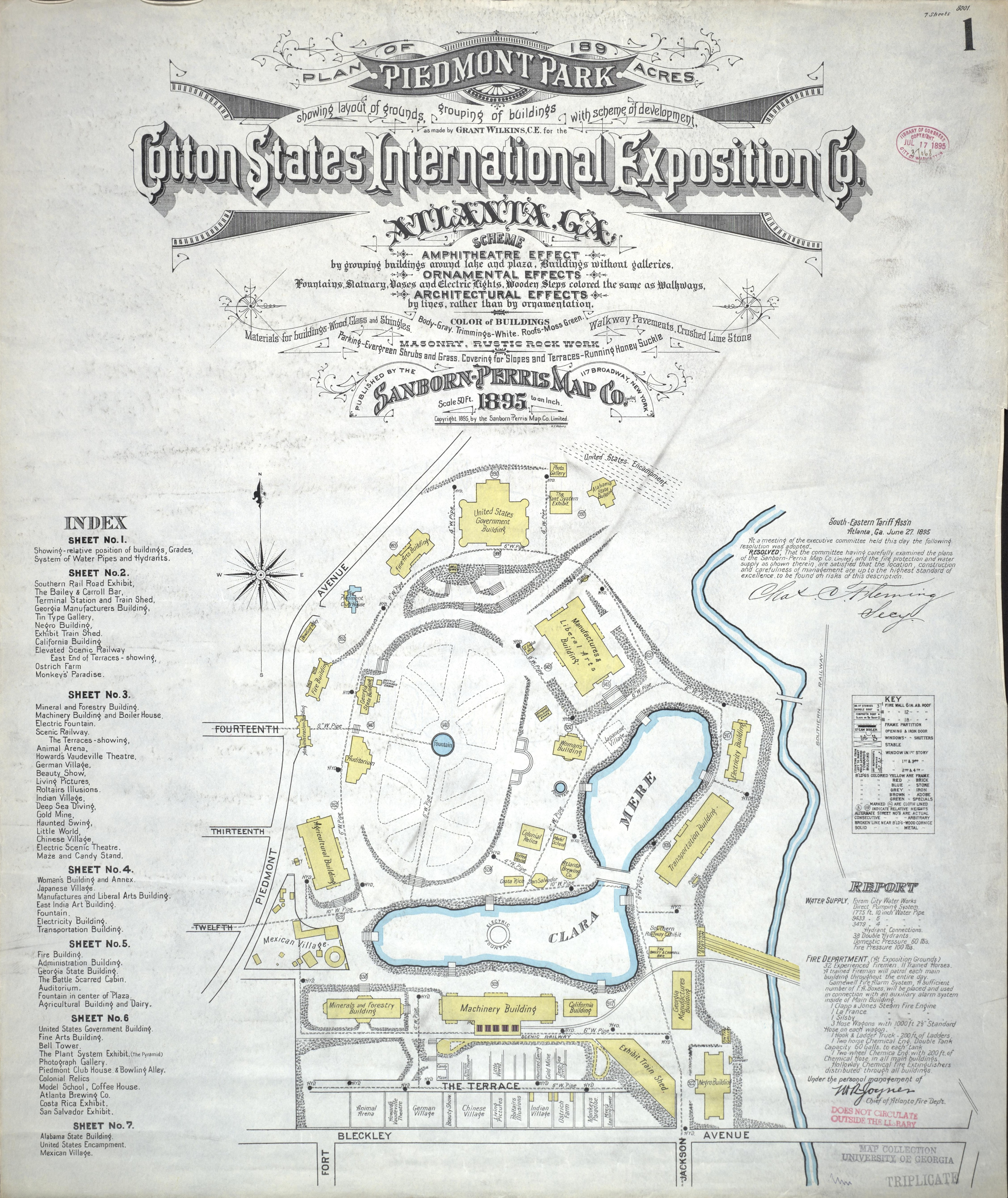
1895 Cotton Exposition Map (The Women's Building was located to the northwest of the lake

The Women's Building was one of 13 exhibition buildings arranged around a 13-acre (5.3 ha) central lake. The Palladian style structure featured a raised basement. The entrance was behind a portico featuring five bays supported by Corinthian columns and measured 128 by 150 feet (39 by 46 m). Mercur designed a four square elevation topped by a dome which rose 90 feet (27 m) from the floor. The dome was surmounted by a statue of a woman holding a torch, representing female enlightenment. Painted pale yellow and white, the exterior presented a grand stair and ornamental friezes, cornices; and balustrades encircling the roof. Mounted statues on ornamental pedestals "symbolic of woman and her power" adorned the roof. Visitors to the Women's Building entered through a soaring central hall, flanked by a grand double stair, in a natural wood finish. The interior composition of well-lit, airy rooms housed the exhibits, which included Colonial artifacts, women's fine art works, and a library of books written by women. It also contained a hospital, nursery, model school, and a fireproof room. The building was described in the event program as a "diamond among jewels" and stood until 1910, when it was razed to allow the construction of Piedmont Park.

=== Children's Building ===
In 1897, Mercur designed a hospital for children at the Marshalsea Poor Farm (later renamed Mayview State Hospital) in Bridgeville, Pennsylvania. At the time of commission, the hospital did not have a separate facility for sick children, who were instead admitted to the women's dormitory. Mercur's design for the Marshalsea Poor Farm was a one-story brick building measuring 48 by 64 feet (15 by 20 m), trimmed in stone. Four pillars support a front portico. The interior design provided a large central sitting room, six sleeping areas with approximately one hundred beds, a separate area for the nurses' rooms, and another for dining. The buildings at the Poor Farm, which had become a psychiatric facility and home for the indigent were damaged by fire in 1907. Mercur's building was later demolished, though the institution remained open until 2008.

=== Washington Female Seminary ===
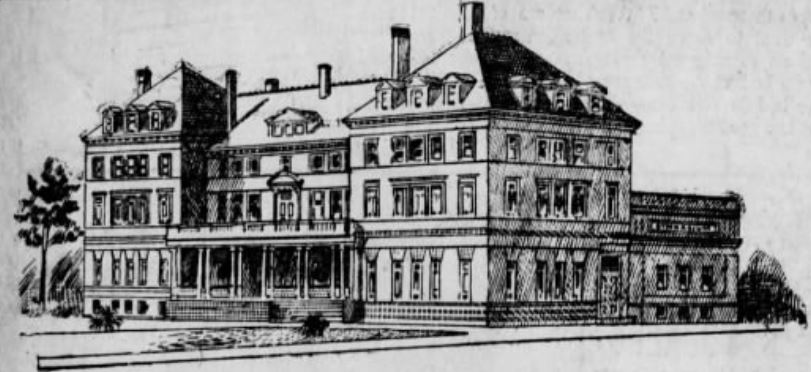
Mercur's drawing for the Washington Female Seminary building, 1896

Washington Female Seminary was a Presbyterian seminary for women in Washington, Pennsylvania, established in 1836. In 1896, the school began exploring the possibility of relocating to a new site, but it was finally determined the costs were excessive and a contract was made with Mercur to build a new building for the school on its existing site on East Maiden and South Lincoln Streets. Built in a Roman classical style, the structure featured buff-colored brick and stone arranged with a four-story main building flanked by two large wings framing a rear courtyard. The east wing housed a 47 by 50 feet (14 by 15 m) assembly room; the face of the main building ran for 170 feet (51.82 m) on Maiden and 125 feet (38.10 m) on Lincoln. The west wing contained administrative offices and quarters, a reception area and parlor, the dining room, and the kitchen. The gymnasium, laboratory, and four classrooms made up the first floor. On the second floor were five classrooms while the third floor contained an atelier, as well as a music and practice rooms. The fourth floor was reserved for resident housing. The contractor for the design was Clara Meade of Chicago, who had learned her trade from her father. Construction was completed in 1898.

In 1939, the female seminary was sold to Washington & Jefferson College, which subsequently renamed the building designed by Mercur as McIlvaine Hall, after alumni Judge John Addison McIlvaine. In 2008, the McIlvaine Hall was razed and a science building was erected on the site. Shortly before the demolition, President Tori Haring-Smith toured a group of alumni through Mercur's building.

== Other selected works ==
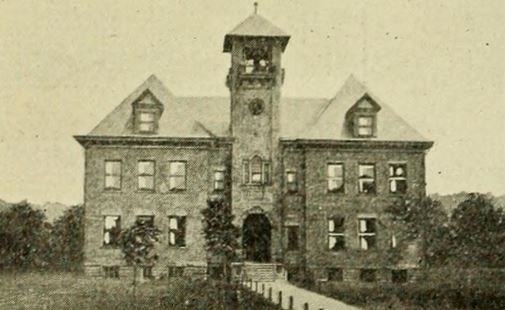
Economy, Pennsylvania, 4th ward school, 1904, Architect Elise Mercur Wagner

- 1895: Beaver College and Musical Institute, College Avenue at Turnpike Street, Beaver, Pennsylvania.
- 1896: Colonial residence, Beaver, Pennsylvania.
- 1896: St. Paul's Episcopal Church, (renamed Christian Tabernacle Kodesh Church of Immanuel), 2601 Center Avenue, the Hill, Pittsburgh, Pennsylvania.
- 1896: Clubhouse for the Twentieth Century Club of Pittsburgh.
- 1897: St. Martin's Episcopal Church, Johnsonburg, Pennsylvania, razed 1965.
- 1897: The McCullough Building, Penn Avenue and 7th Street, Pittsburgh, Pennsylvania.
- 1897: Y.W.C.A., Syracuse, New York, a 6-story building with an estimated cost of $100,000.
- 1897: Y.W.C.A. at Penn Avenue and 5th Street, Pittsburgh, six stories.
- 1897: Y.M.C.A., Pittsburgh, Pennsylvania, a 9-story building projected to cost of $250,000 to build.
- 1898: Daughters of the American Revolution Home, at Fort Pitt Blockhouse, Pittsburgh, Pennsylvania.
- before 1900: St. John's Chapel, Pittsburgh.
- before 1900: Pittsburgh College for Women, remodeling.
- 1900 Wilson College building, Chambersburg, Pennsylvania.
- 1904: Economy Public School (renamed Fourth Ward School) at Laughlin and 16th Streets in Ambridge, Pennsylvania (razed 1964).
- 1904: Second Ward School, later Ambridge Recreational Center, and Community College of Beaver County Practical Nursing School, on Maplewood Avenue at Eighth Street in Ambridge, Pennsylvania. The school was later occupied by Ambridge Recreation, the Community College of Beaver County Practical Nursing School, and the Ambridge High School for Shop and Industrial Arts, before its demolition in 1972.
- 1904: Private residence in Economy, Pennsylvania.
- A group of tract homes for workers in Leetsdale, Pennsylvania.

=== Published works ===
- Wagner, Elise Mercur (1924). Economy of Old and Ambridge of Today: Historical Outlines, Embracing the Settlement and Life of Economy of Old, Together with the Vast Development in Recent Years of Ambridge and Surroundings on this Historic Spot. Ambridge, Pennsylvania: Harmony Society. OCLC 6370004.
