= Mayview State Hospital =

Coordinates: 40.3270°N 80.1093°W

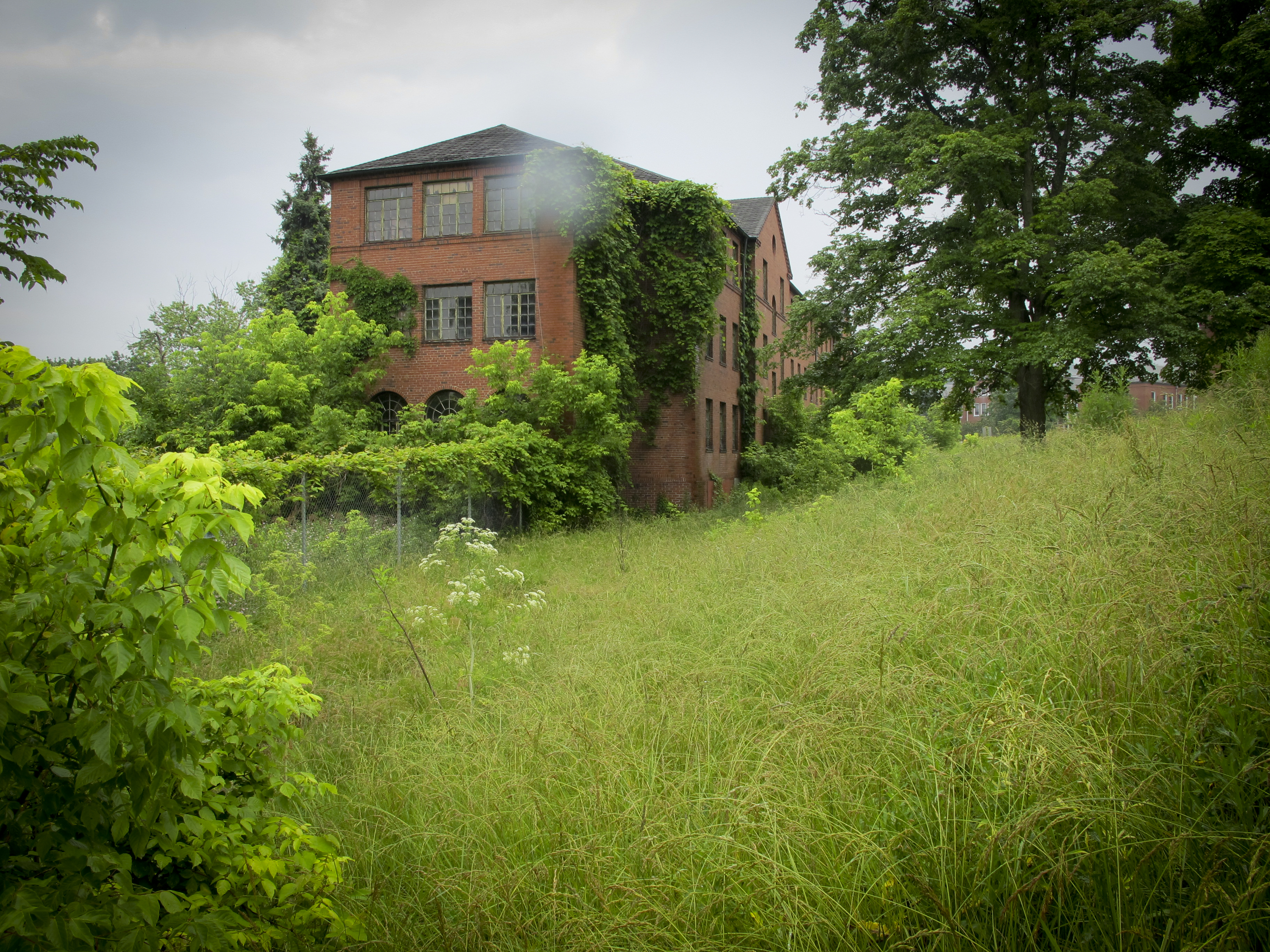
- Mayview State Hospital

Geography
- Location: South Fayette Township, Allegheny County, Pennsylvania, United States

Organization
- Type: Specialist

Services
- Emergency department: None
- Speciality: Psychiatric hospital

History
- Former name: Marshalsea Poor Farm
- Founded: 1893
- Closed: 2008
- Demolished: 2016

Links
- Lists: Hospitals in Pennsylvania

Mayview State Hospital was a psychiatric hospital, originally known as Marshalsea Poor Farm, located in South Fayette Township near Bridgeville, Pennsylvania. It spanned 335 acres (136 ha) and had 39 buildings, 12 of which were used for patient care and hospital administration. It had a staff count of approximately 502 as of August 2007, and an operating budget of $63 million per year. It was demolished in 2016 to build residential housing.

== History ==
Mayview State Hospital was opened in 1893 by the City of Pittsburgh under the name Marshalsea, after the famous London debtors' prison where Charles Dickens' father was once held. The campus size was 243 acres (98 ha) at the time. In the 1890s, there were about 340 patients.

In 1897, Elise Mercur was hired to design a children's hospital for the facility, as there was no separate building for sick children. Until that time, children were admitted to the women's dormitory.

A night fire on July 31, 1907 that started by an overheated boiler in the laundry and bakehouse area, swept through the Poor Farm and Asylum, housing 900 patients. The entire annex was ablaze when the first alarm was sounded, and fire-brigade worked with the limited supply of hose and water, while attendants began removing patients on their cots. During the panic caused by the fire, many patients were injured. A heavy downpour of rain was of great assistance in controlling the fire which raged for three hours, till 1 a. m. The property loss was between $75,000 and $100,000. According to the Minutes of the Proceedings of the Council of the City of Pittsburgh, the Poor Farm property was appropriated in 1913. In 1917, Engineering News announced bids would be requested for construction on the property for use by a coal mine which fed a power plant that produced steam for heat and electricity .

In 1916, Marshalsea was renamed Pittsburgh City Home and Hospital at Mayview.

By 1934, there were 4,200 patients and 450 staff at Mayview.

On June 1, 1941, the Commonwealth of Pennsylvania took over responsibility for the hospital. There were 3,200 patients at that time.

In 1946, an observation unit was created. In 1974, it became the forensic center.

In 2001, Kevin Benson served as the grand marshal of the hospital's annual parade.

== Closure ==
On August 15, 2007, it was announced that the civil section of Mayview would be closed by December 31, 2008. The patient census for civil was then 225. The patients at that time were to be individually assessed then discharged into less restrictive, community-based settings "to reduce reliance on institutional care and improve access to home and community-based services for Pennsylvanians living with mental illness." Those who were assessed as needing continuing treatment were transferred to another state hospital.

Concurrent with the closing, the facility's forensic center was to be either consolidated and/or privatized with other forensic units at Norristown and Warren State Hospitals. As of August 2007, there were 70 patients in the forensic center at Mayview.

The closure was halted for two weeks in November 2007 after the deaths of two former Mayview patients. One jumped or fell from a bridge and the other was struck by a train.

On February 21, 2008, a task force met at Mayview to discuss possible uses for the site after the hospital's closing.

In November 2008, all 47 remaining forensic patients were moved to Torrance State Hospital in Torrance Pennsylvania.

From August 2007 to December 2008, over 200 former patients were moved into community-based settings, most of which having 24-hour on-site support staff. Mayview officially closed at the end of December 2008.

In June 2010, Mayview State Hospital was sold for $505,000. The agreement between the state and Aloe Brothers of Mt. Washington, which was signed May 24, covers about 150 acres (61 ha) of land and the buildings on the site.
