= Lerch Tavern =

- U.S. National Register of Historic Places
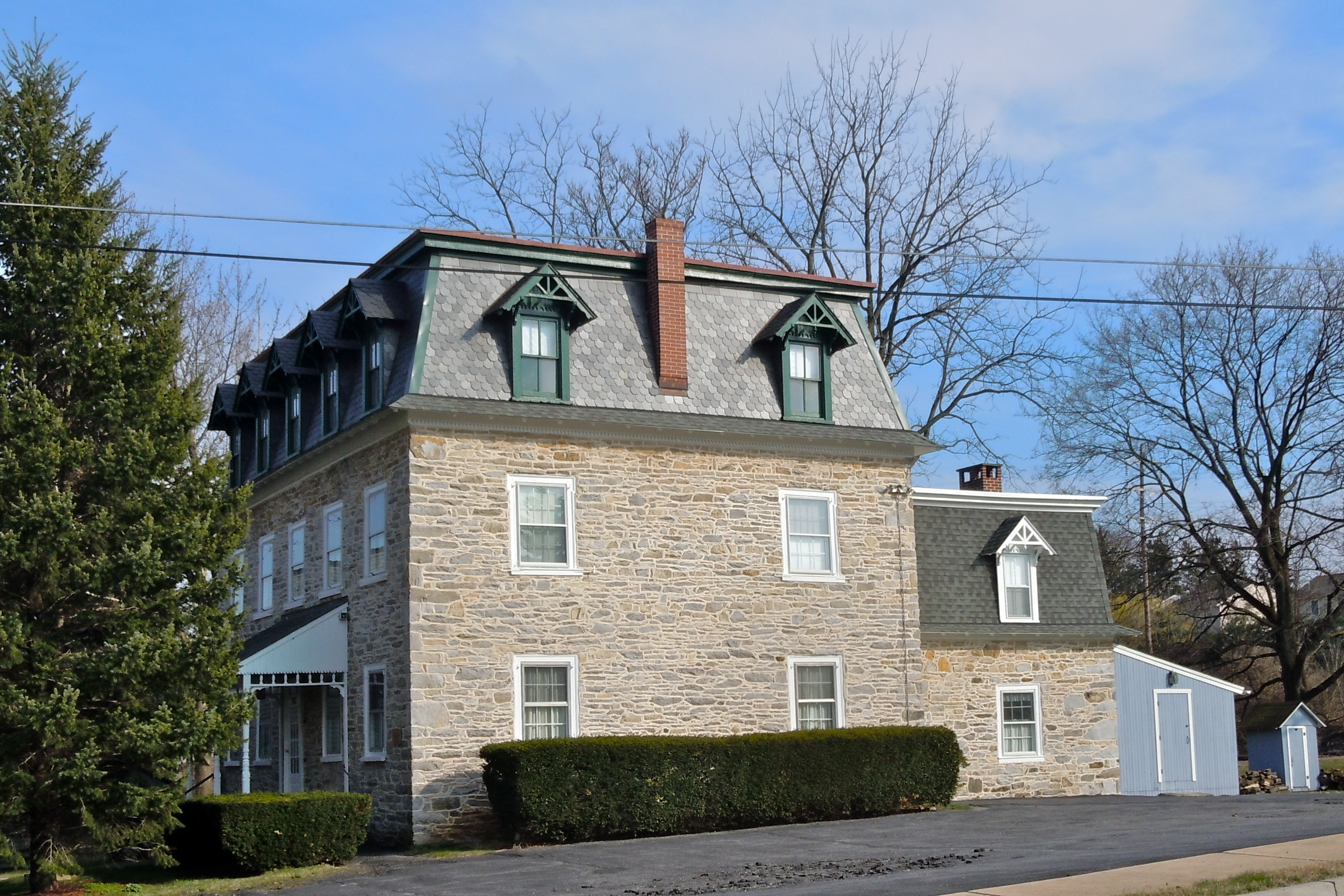
- Lerch Tavern, April 2011

- Location within Pennsylvania Location within the United States
- Location: 182-184 W. Penn Ave, Wernersville, Pennsylvania
- Coordinates: 40°19′47″N 76°5′3″W
- Area: 9 acres (3.6 ha)
- Built: 1797, c. 1870
- Built by: Lerch, John Yost
- NRHP reference No.: 79002171
- Added to NRHP: September 12, 1979

Lerch Tavern is an historic inn and tavern building in Wernersville, Berks County, Pennsylvania, United States.

It was added to the National Register of Historic Places in 1979.

== History and architectural features ==
Built in 1797, this historic structure is a two-story, rectangular, limestone building. It measures five bays by two bays, and thirty-two feet by forty-two feet. The raised mansard roof was added circa 1870, replacing an earlier gable roof. The tavern operated into the 1850s, after which it was occupied as a private residence. It remained in the Lerch family from the time of its construction into the 1950s.
