= John McArthur Jr. =

American architect

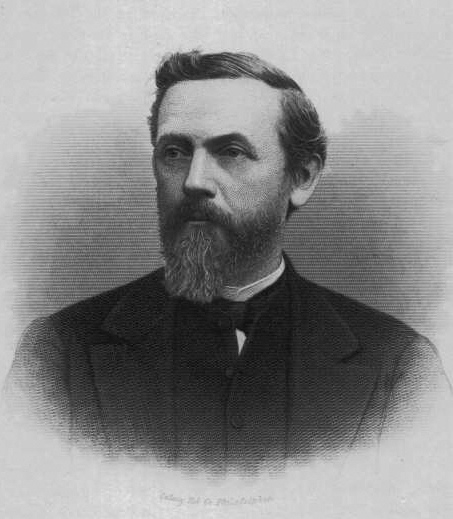
An 1860 illustration of McArthur

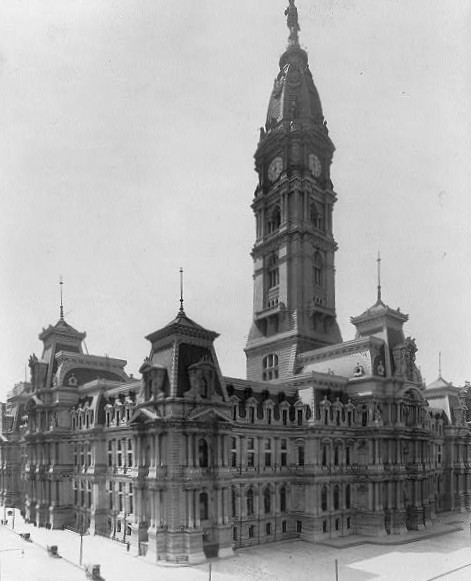
Upon its completion, Philadelphia City Hall, built between 1874 and 1901, was the tallest occupied building in the world and the world's third-tallest building structure after the Washington Monument, which is 7 feet / 2.1 meters taller, and the Eiffel Tower, which is 515 feet / 157 meters taller. It remains the world's tallest all-masonry occupied building.

John McArthur Jr. (1823–1890) was a prominent American architect based in Philadelphia. Best remembered as the architect of the landmark Philadelphia City Hall, McArthur also designed some of the city's most ambitious buildings of the Civil War era. Few of his buildings survive.

== Career ==
John McArthur Jr. was born in Bladenock, Scotland, on 13 May 1823, and came to the United States with his family when he was ten years old. Much of his mature style was characterized by Italianate and Second Empire forms and several of his best-known buildings feature mansard roofs, which he helped to introduce and popularize in the United States. During the American Civil War, McArthur planned 24 temporary war hospitals, including Fort Delaware's 600-bed hospital on Pea Patch Island.

Philadelphia has looked up to McArthur's architecture for more than a century. The 250-foot-tall tower-and-spire of his Tenth Presbyterian Church (1854) was the tallest structure in the city when built. (Its 150-foot wooden spire was removed in 1912.) Later, this was surpassed by the tower of City Hall (1874–1901), whose 548 feet (167 meters) made it the tallest occupied building in the world when completed. Until the late 20th century, an unwritten agreement among Philadelphia architects kept all buildings shorter than the top of the statue of William Penn atop McArthur's tower.

== Personal life ==
A Presbyterian and a member of Tenth Church, McArthur was married to Matilda Prevost; they had two sons and two daughters.

== Death ==
McArthur died in Philadelphia on January 8, 1890.

== Architectural work ==
This is a partial list.

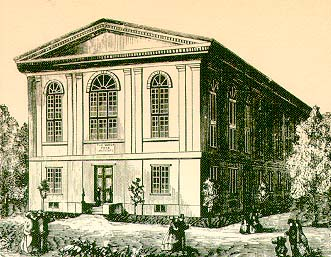
Wagner Free Institute of Science, Philadelphia (1859-65)

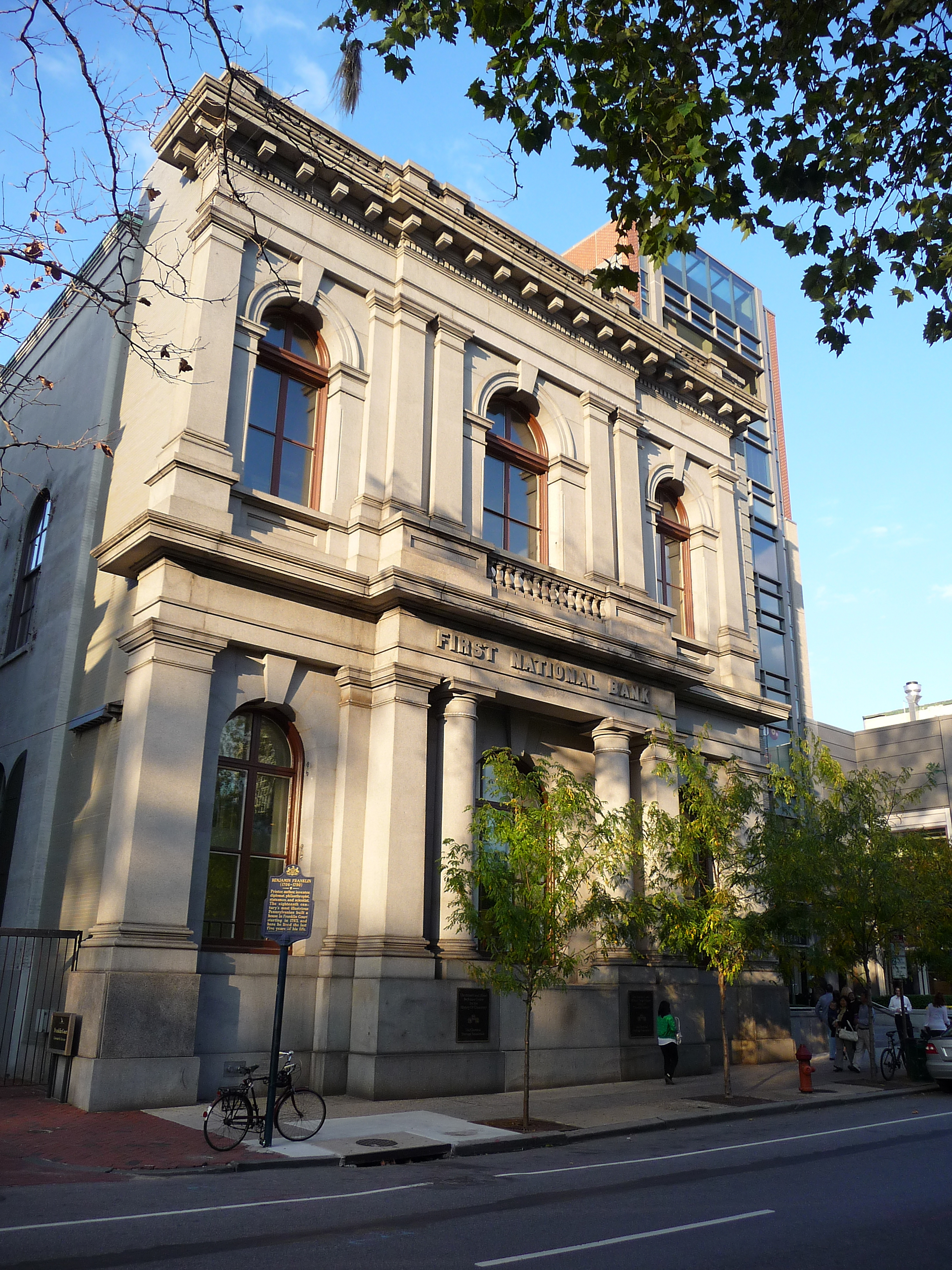
First National Bank building, now Science History Institute, Philadelphia

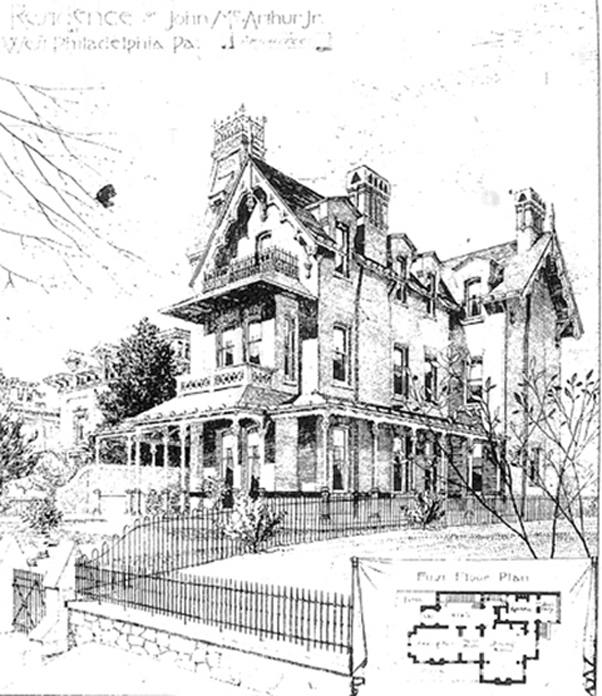
"Residence for John McArthur Jr. West Philadelphia, Pa." (1881, demolished).

Plan for U.S. Army Hospital, Fort Delaware, Pea Patch Island, DE (1863, demolished). This 600-bed hospital served the garrison, Confederate prisoners, and civilians.

=== Philadelphia buildings ===
- Tenth Presbyterian Church, 17th & Spruce Sts., Philadelphia (1854, altered by Frank Miles Day 1893)
- Wagner Free Institute of Science, 1700 W. Montgomery Ave., Philadelphia (1859–65)
- First National Bank Building, 315 Chestnut Street, Philadelphia (1865–67). Now the Science History Institute.
- Philadelphia City Hall, Penn Square, Philadelphia (1874–1901) (with Thomas U. Walter)

==== Demolished Philadelphia buildings ====
- Assembly Building, 10th & Chestnut Sts. Philadelphia (1851, rebuilt 1852 possibly by McArthur, demolished)
- Girard House Hotel, n. side of Chestnut St. at 9th St., Philadelphia (1852, demolished)
- La Pierre House, South Broad St., Philadelphia (1856, demolished)
- Continental Hotel, SE corner 9th & Chestnut Sts., Philadelphia (1857–1860, demolished)
- American Sunday School Union building, 316-320 Chestnut St., Philadelphia (1858, demolished)
- Franklin Farmers' Market, 100 block of Market St., Philadelphia (1859, demolished)
- Mikveh Israel Synagogue, 117 N. 7th St., Philadelphia (1860, demolished)
- Mower Hospital (temporary Civil War hospital), Wyndmoor, Philadelphia (1863, demolished)
- Residence for Dr. David Jayne, 19th & Chestnut Sts., Philadelphia (1865, demolished)
- Public Ledger Building, SW corner 6th & Chestnut Sts., Philadelphia (1867, demolished)
- John McArthur Jr. Residence, 4203 Walnut St., Philadelphia (1881, demolished).
- Children's Ward, Presbyterian Hospital, 39th & Filbert Sts., Philadelphia (1881–88, demolished).
- Entrance, The Woodlands, Philadelphia (1936, demolished)

=== Buildings elsewhere ===
- First Presbyterian Church, Capitol Square, 10th & Capitol Sts., Richmond, Virginia (1852-3)
- Media Presbyterian Church, Media, Pennsylvania (1853-1854)
- U.S. Naval Hospital, Mare Island, California (1870)
- U.S. Army Hospital, Fort Delaware, Pea Patch Island, Delaware. (1863, demolished)
- State Hospital for the Insane, Danville, Pennsylvania (1869). Still in use as Danville State Hospital.
- Pardee Hall, Lafayette College, Easton, Pennsylvania (1873).
- Hospital for the Insane, Warren, Pennsylvania (1874) (a Kirkbride Plan building). Still in use as Warren State Hospital.

== Gallery ==
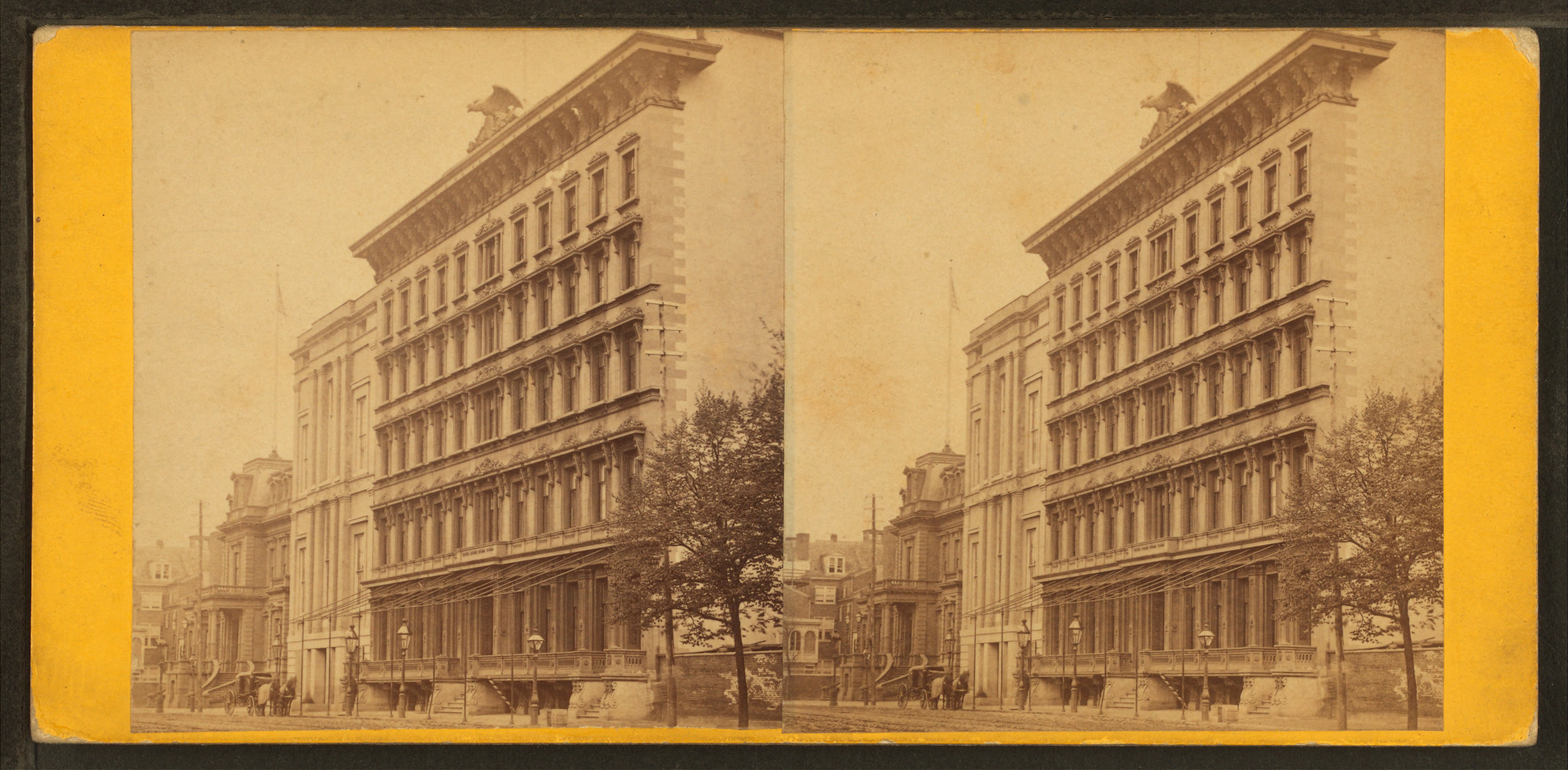
La Pierre House, 100 block of South Broad St., Philadelphia (1856, demolished)

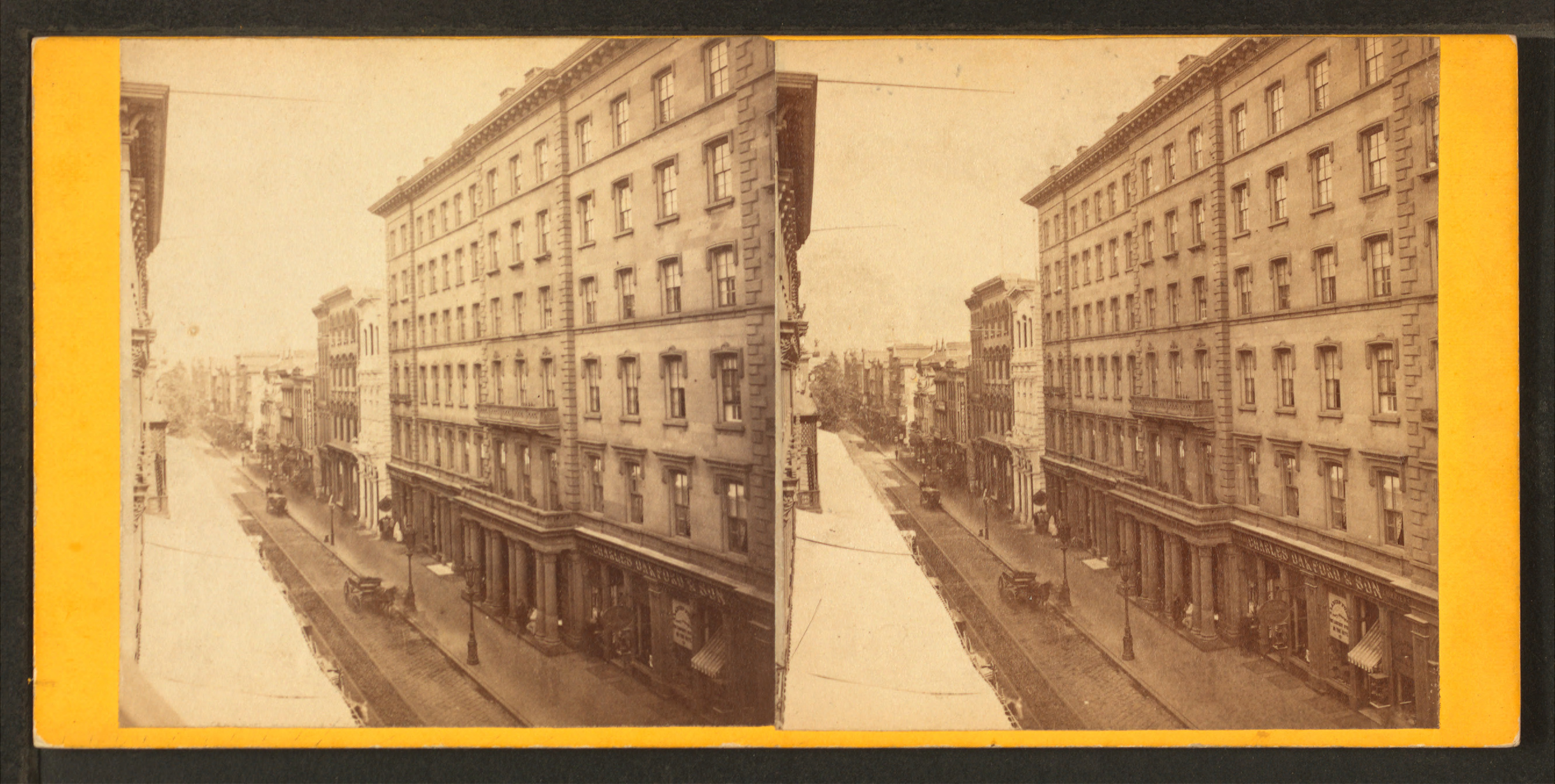
Continental Hotel, SE corner 9th & Chestnut Sts., Philadelphia (1857–1860, demolished).

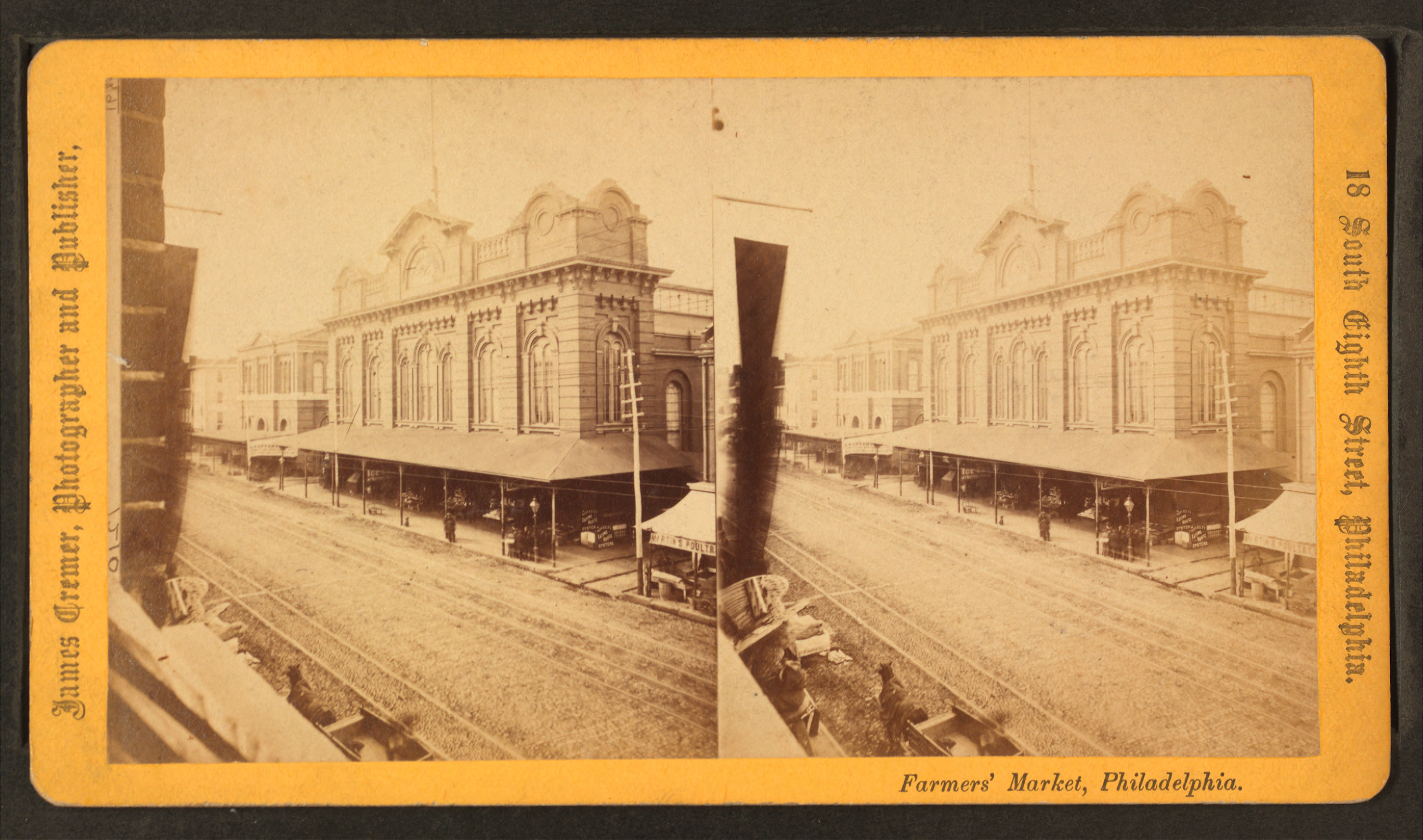
Franklin Farmers' Market, 100 block Market St., Philadelphia (1859, demolished).

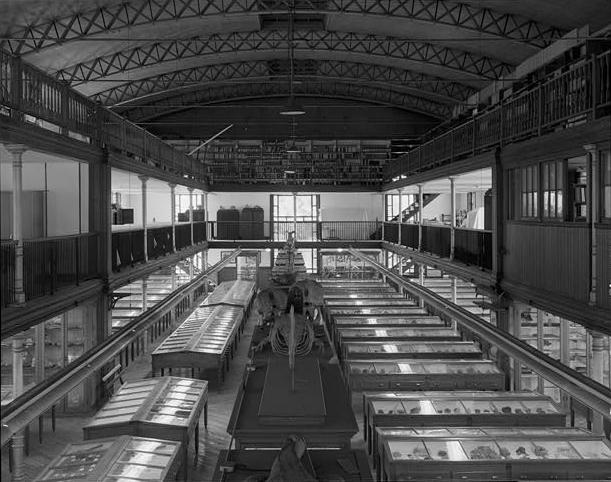
Wagner Free Institute of Science (1859–65), second-floor Hall and galleries.

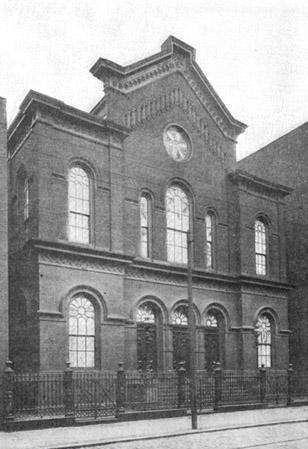
Mikveh Israel Synagogue, 117 N. 17th St., Philadelphia (1860, demolished).

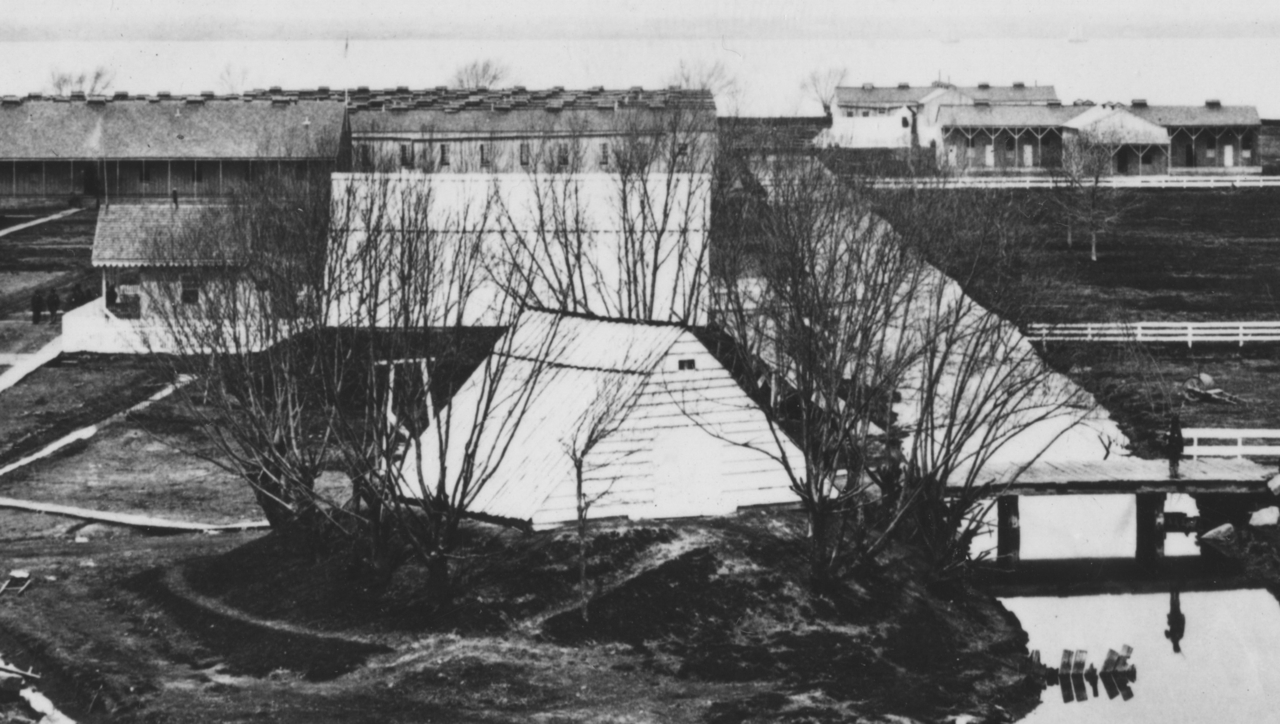
U.S. Hospital, Fort Delaware, Pea Patch Island, DE (1863, demolished).

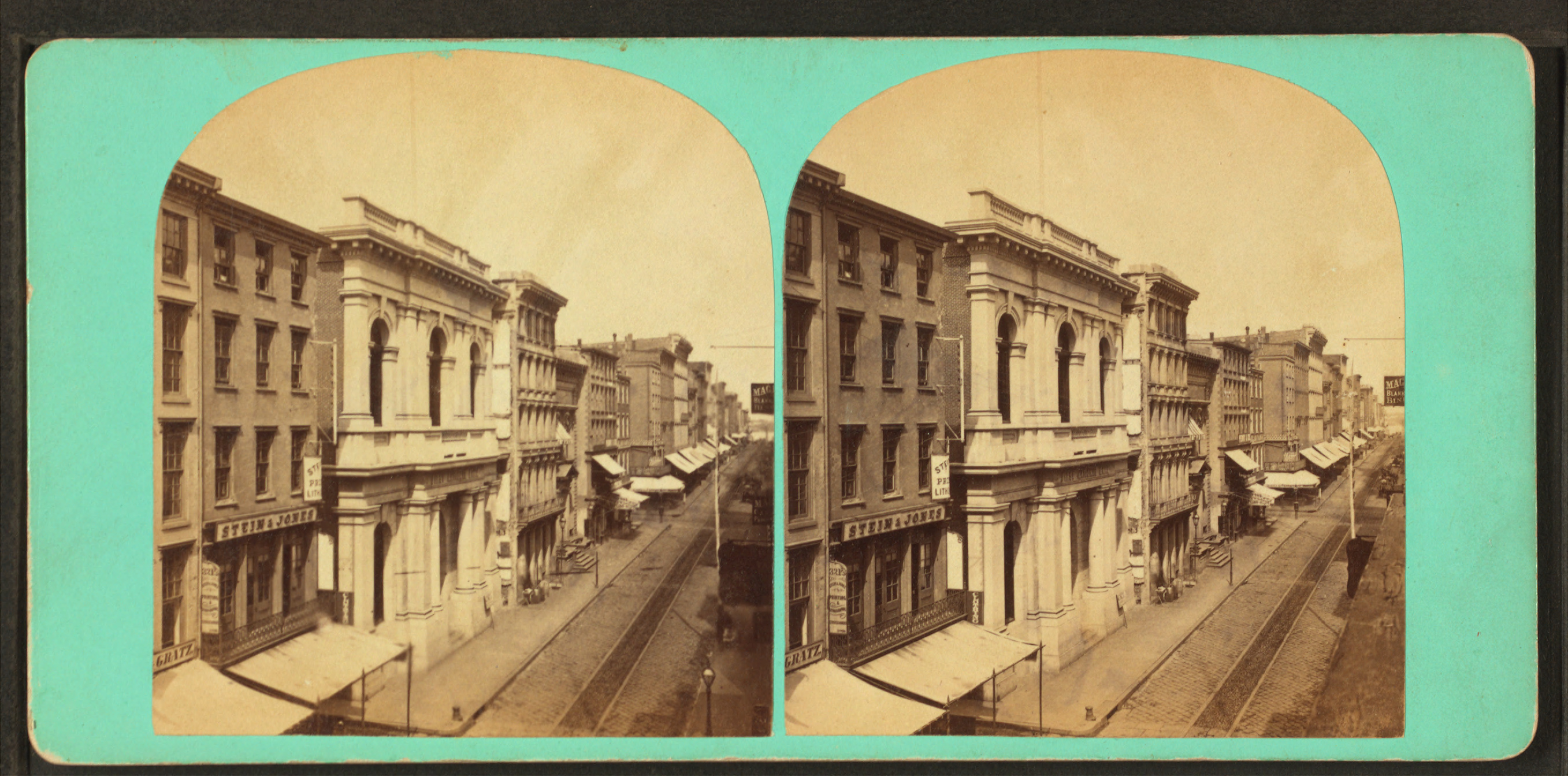
First National Bank, 315 Chestnut St., Philadelphia (1865–67). Now Science History Institute.

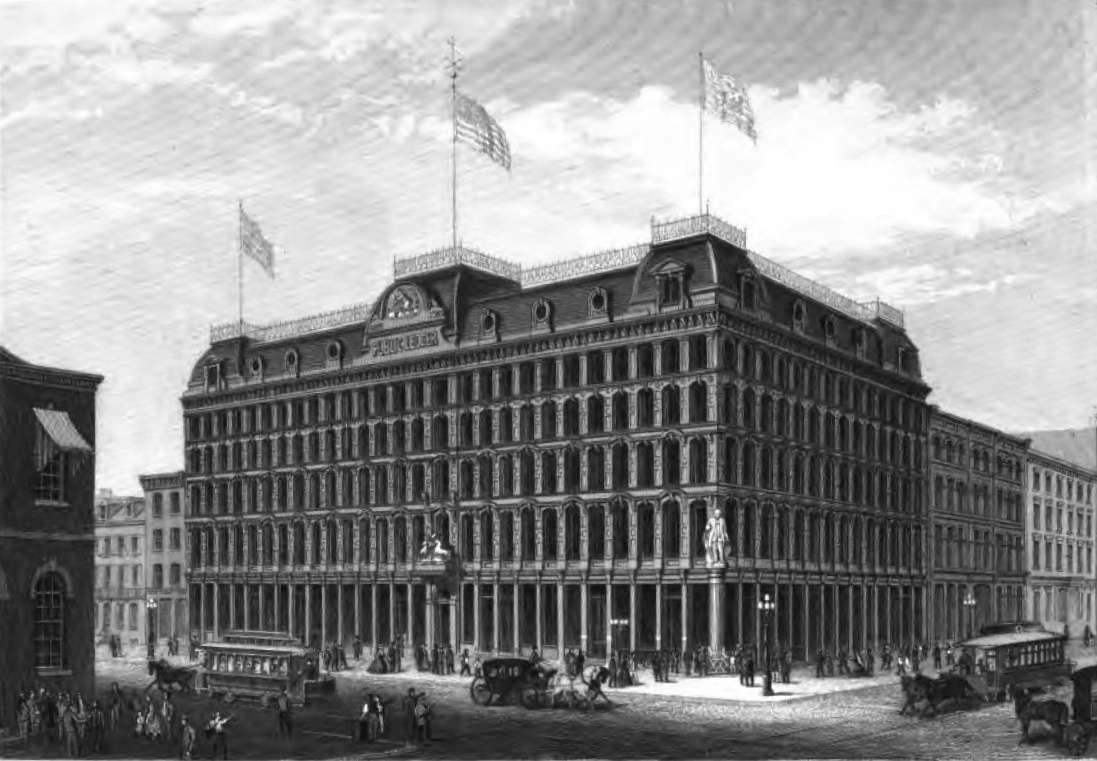
Public Ledger Building, SW corner 6th & Chestnut Sts., Philadelphia (1867, demolished).

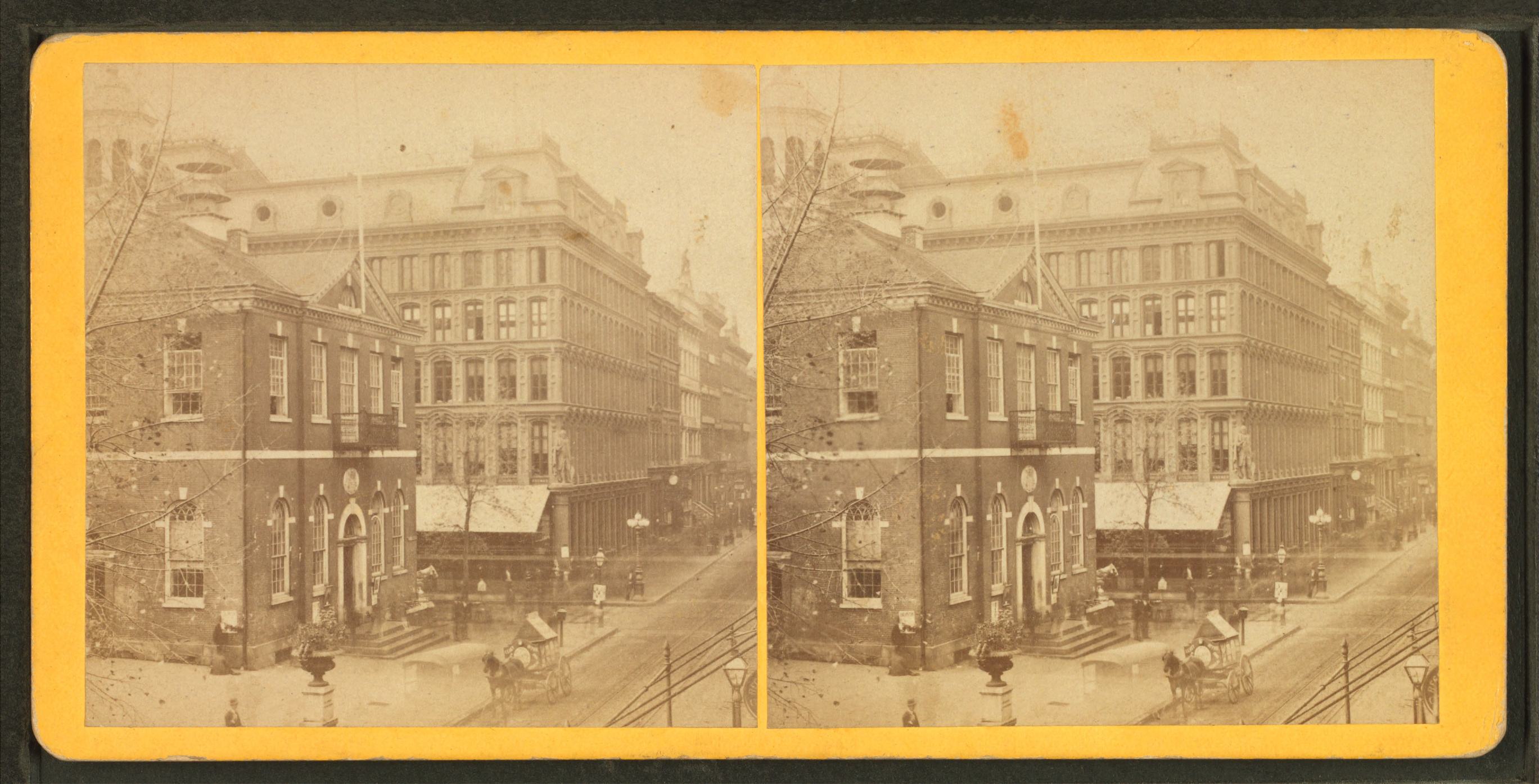
Congress Hall and Public Ledger Building.

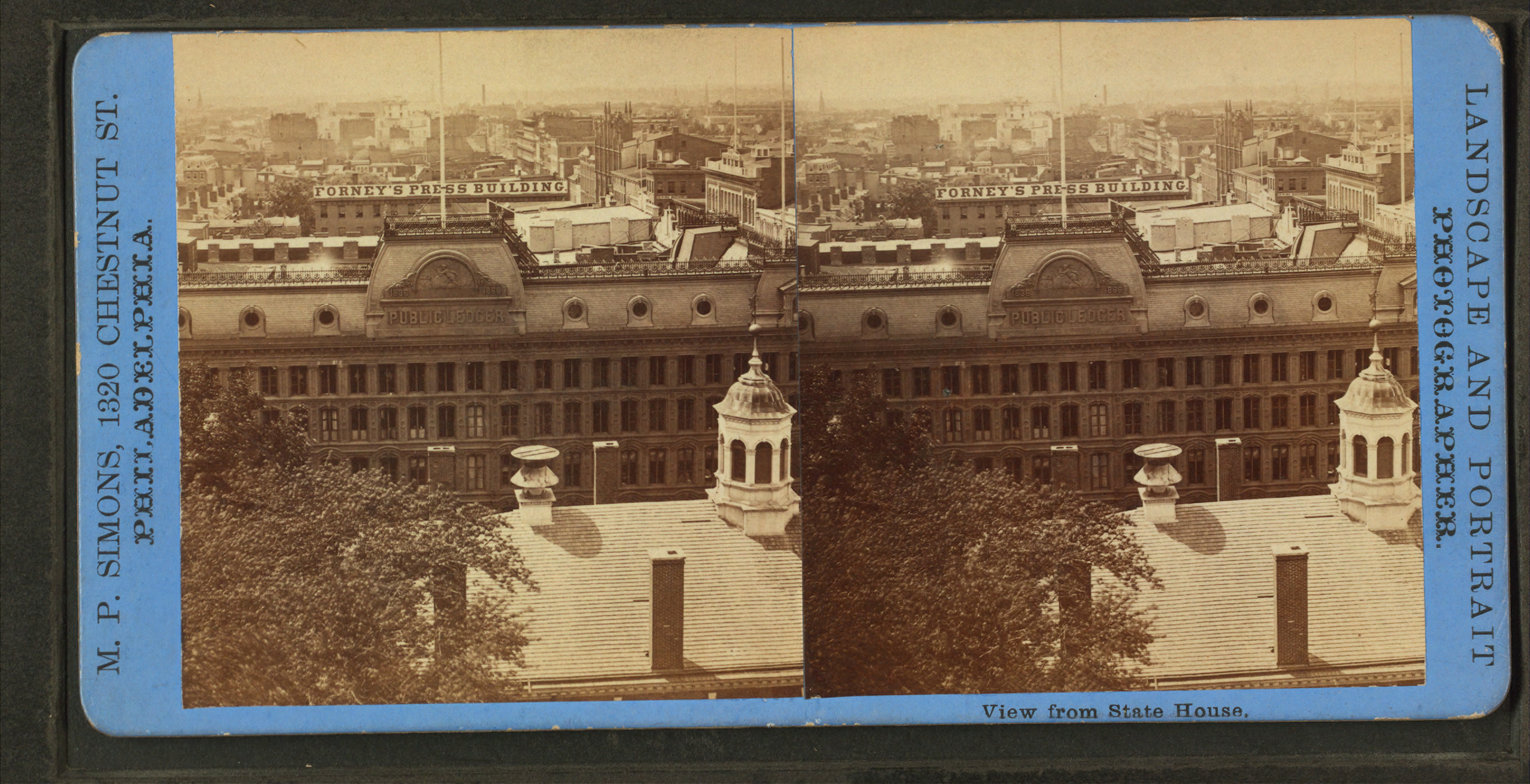
Public Ledger Building from Independence Hall tower.

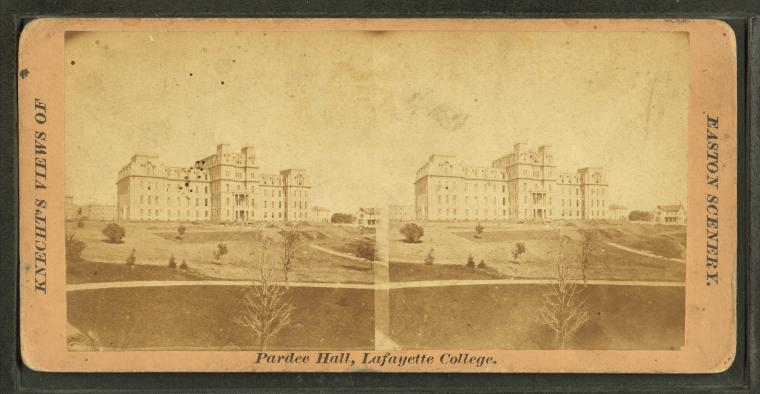
Pardee Hall, Lafayette College, Easton, PA (1873).

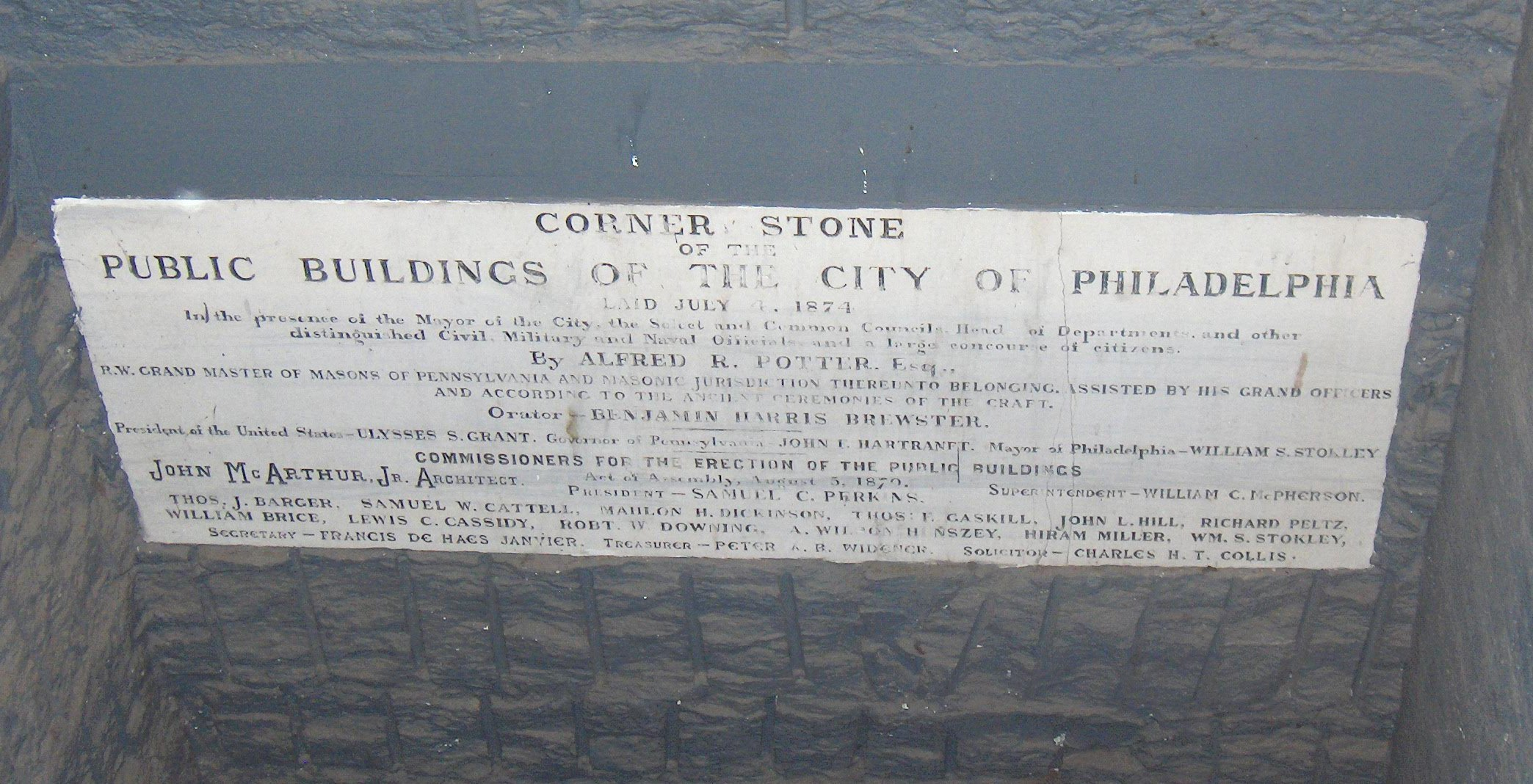
Philadelphia City Hall cornerstone. Laid July 4, 1874.

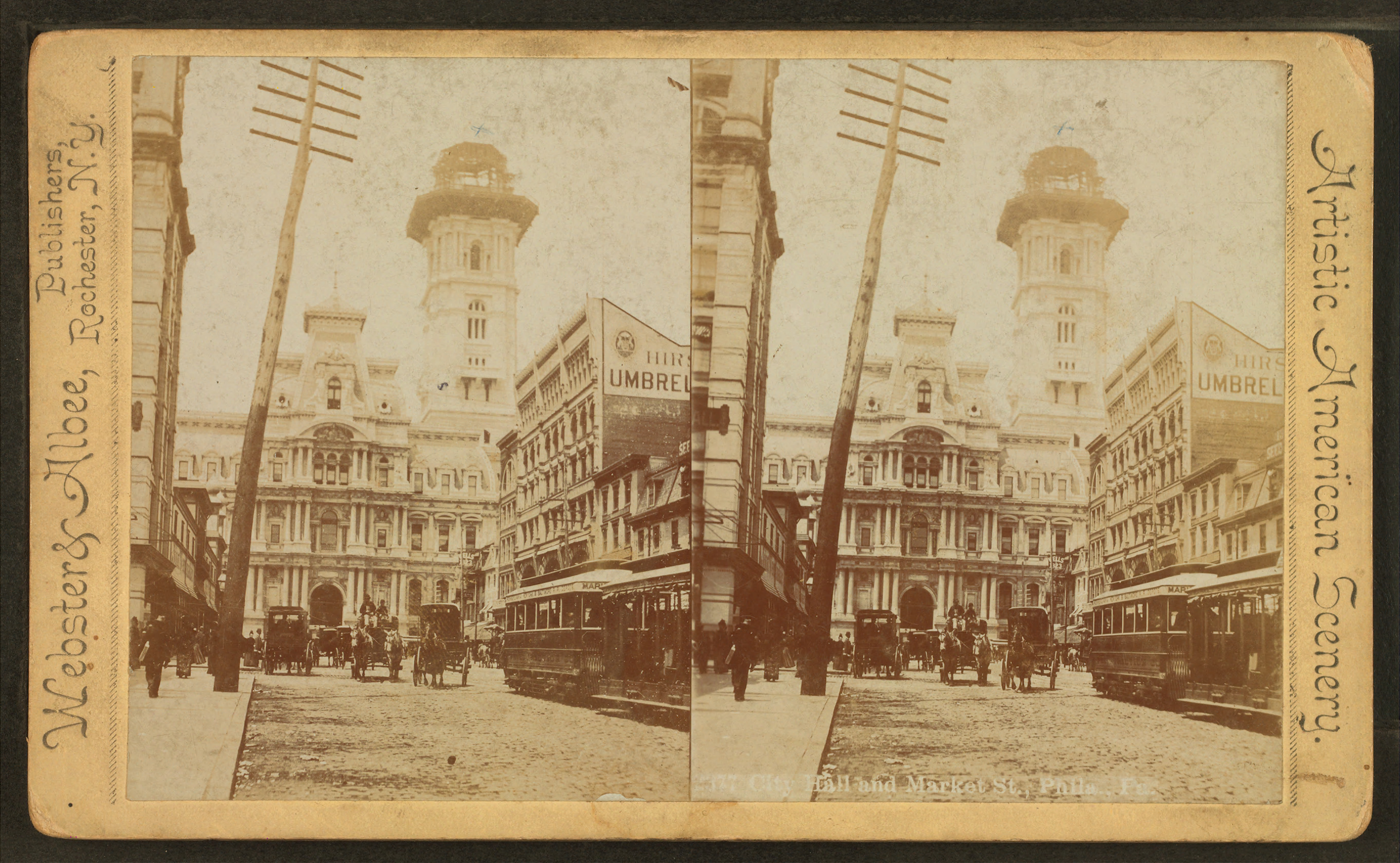
Philadelphia City Hall Tower under construction, 1890s?

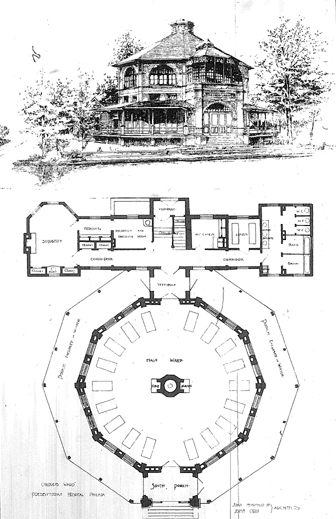
Children's Ward, Presbyterian Hospital, Philadelphia (1881–88, demolished).

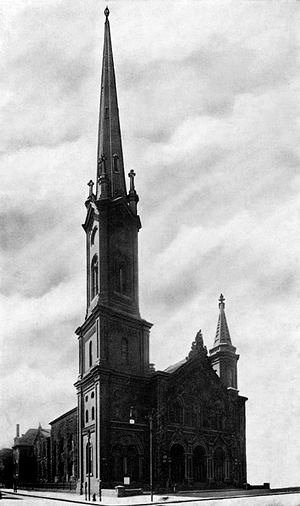
Tenth Presbyterian Church, Philadelphia (1854)

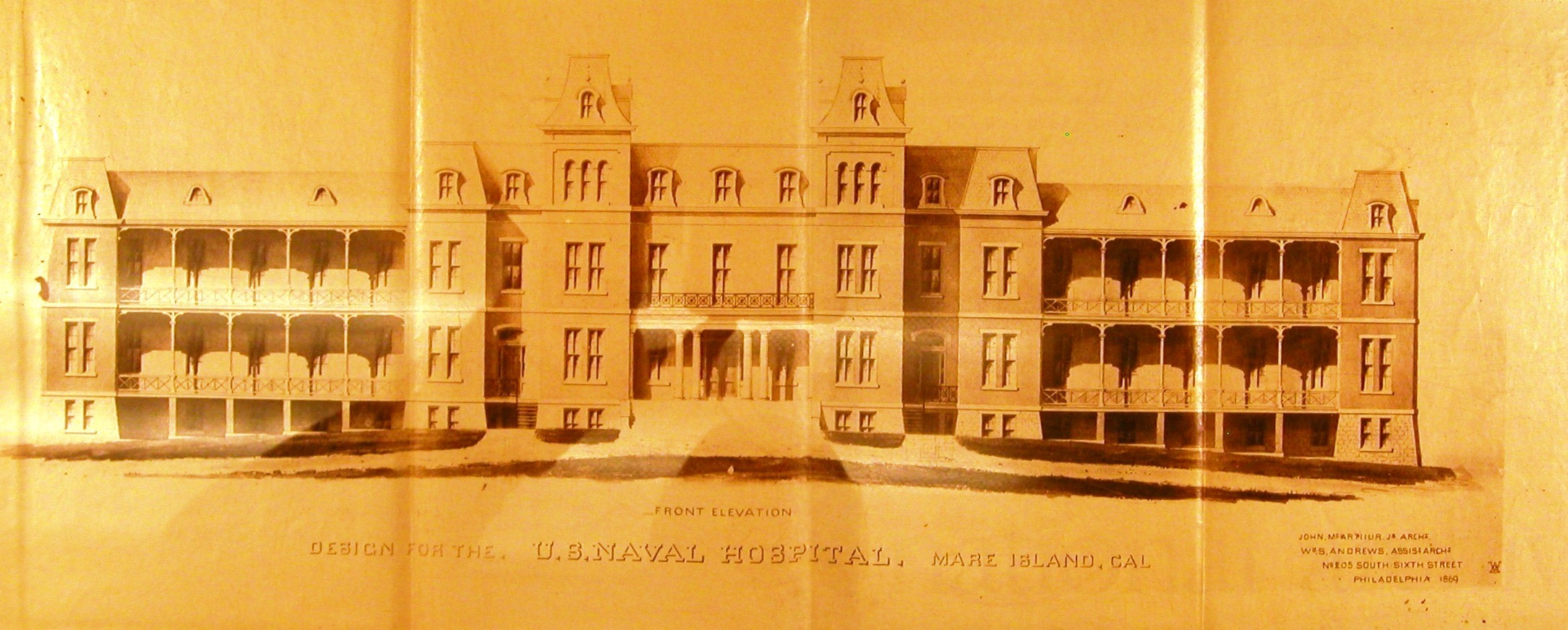
Naval Hospital at Mare Island, California.

== Descendants ==
A descendant, David Paul McArthur, works as an architect out of the Fishtown section of Philadelphia.
