= Wertz Mill =

- U.S. National Register of Historic Places
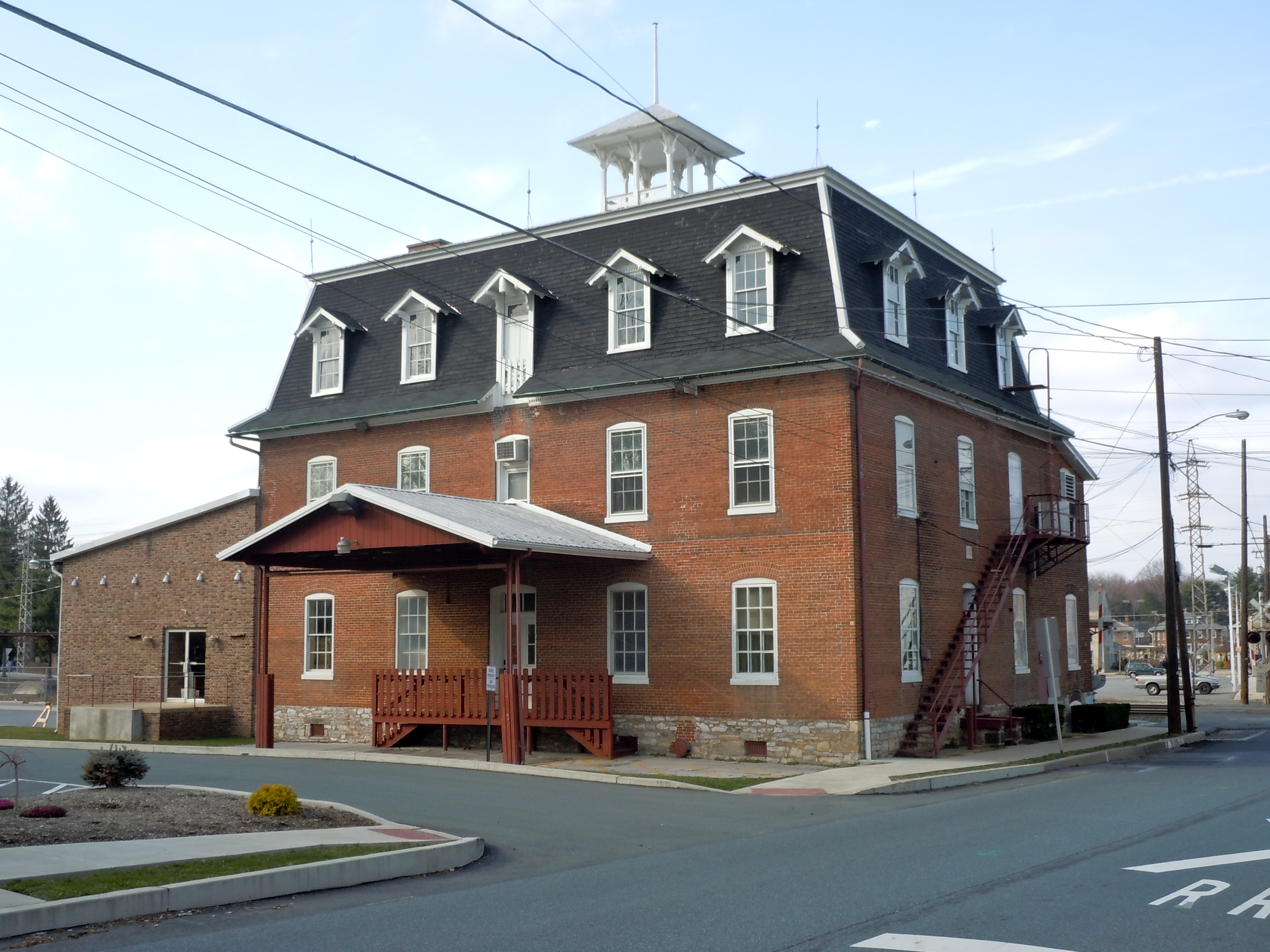
- Wertz Mill, April 2011

- Location within Pennsylvania Location within the United States
- Location: 60 Werner St., Wernersville, Pennsylvania
- Coordinates: 40°19′41″N 76°4′47″W
- Area: less than one acre
- Built: 1892
- Architectural style: Second Empire
- MPS: Gristmills in Berks County MPS
- NRHP reference No.: 90001635
- Added to NRHP: November 8, 1990

Wertz Mill is a historic grist mill located in Wernersville, Berks County, Pennsylvania. It was built in 1892, and is a three-story, brick building with a mansard roof in the Second Empire style. It measures 60 feet by 58 feet, 3 inches, and features a cupola atop the roof. It has a two-story, brick extension built in the 1930s. The mill remained in operation until 1969.

It was listed on the National Register of Historic Places in 1990.
