= Torrance State Hospital =

- Pennsylvania Department of Human Services
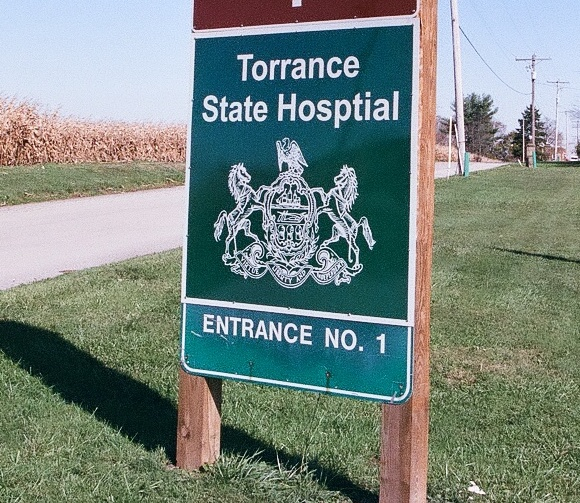

Geography
- Location: 121 Longview Drive, Torrance, PA 15779, Westmoreland County, Pennsylvania, United States

Organization
- Care system: Public Mental Health
- Type: Mental Health

Services
- Emergency department: No

Helipads
- Helipad: No

History
- Founded: 1919

Links
- Website: Torrance State Hospital
- Lists: Hospitals in Pennsylvania
- Other links: State Hospitals in Pennsylvania

Torrance State Hospital is one of six State Hospitals in the Commonwealth of Pennsylvania.

The facility, operated by the Pennsylvania Department of Human Services, Office of Mental Health and Substance Abuse Services (OMHSAS), provides inpatient treatment for people with severe and persistent mental illness. It and Norristown State Hospital (formerly known as "The State Lunatic Asylum at Norristown") are the only two hospitals in Pennsylvania which care for mentally ill patients who have committed major crimes. Torrance generally admits patients after hospitalization at a community health care facility. If the treating physician determines that the patient requires longer term involuntary psychiatric treatment, the appropriate state agency initiates a referral to Torrance.

== Location ==
Torrance State Hospital is located on a 376-acre campus in the foothills of the Chestnut Ridge, a rural area 45 miles east of Pittsburgh just off Route 22 in Derry Township, Westmoreland County.

== History ==
Torrance opened its doors on November 25, 1919, with the transfer of five patients from Danville Hospital.

The original patient census of five grew to a patient count of nearly 3,300 in the 1950s and 1960s, reflecting the attitudes of society toward mental illness. With the passage of legislation in 1966, which established the community-based mental health system, the stage was set for what became known as the "de-institutionalization movement". Throughout the 1970s to the present, Torrance State Hospital has continued its evolution, ever decreasing its census by affording patients the opportunity to resume community living. The Long Term Care Unit, a licensed Skilled Nursing Facility, was closed in 1996 and the Mental Retardation Unit, which had long been located at Torrance State Hospital, was closed in June 1998. By January 2019, the hospital had less than 300 patients.

== Unused buildings ==
Torrance had four unused buildings as of November 2020. As the need for psychiatric and long-term care beds on the grounds of the state hospital has decreased and availability of community supports has increased, some areas of the physical plant have been converted to other uses. These include:

- First Link, consumer-operated Drop-In Center programs regarding peer support, including the Annual Consumer Developed and Facilitated Hospital and Community Conference;
- Cove Prep, a psycho-sexual rehabilitation and education program for males aged 12–20 operated by White Deer Run Treatment Network.; and
- The Sexual Responsibility Treatment Program for adjudicated youth aging out of the juvenile justice system who have a "mental abnormality" that renders them unable to control their violent sexual impulses.

The South West Secure Treatment Unit, a facility operated by the Department of Human Service's Office of Children, Family and Youth for adjudicated juveniles, is no longer located on the grounds.

== Philosophy and treatment approaches ==
Torrance State Hospital's philosophy and treatment approaches have evolved over the years in direct correlation with the development of best practices in behavioral health care, reflective of research and treatment innovations. Torrance State Hospital is a dynamic, treatment-oriented, modern psychiatric facility; emphasizing thorough and accurate assessment, appropriate treatment, treatment outcome measurement, accountability and efficiency. Documentation in all treatment and administrative programs is in accordance with the current standards of the various applicable certification and accreditation agencies. Its vision for the 21st century is to be one of the dynamic providers within the mental health delivery system for Southwestern Pennsylvania, dedicated to the promotion of recovery from mental illness and return to community living.

== Geographical catchment area ==
The geographic catchment area of Torrance State Hospital includes the counties of Allegheny, Armstrong, Bedford, Blair, Butler, Cambria, Fayette, Indiana, Somerset and Westmoreland.
