= Danville State Hospital =

- Pennsylvania Department of Human Services
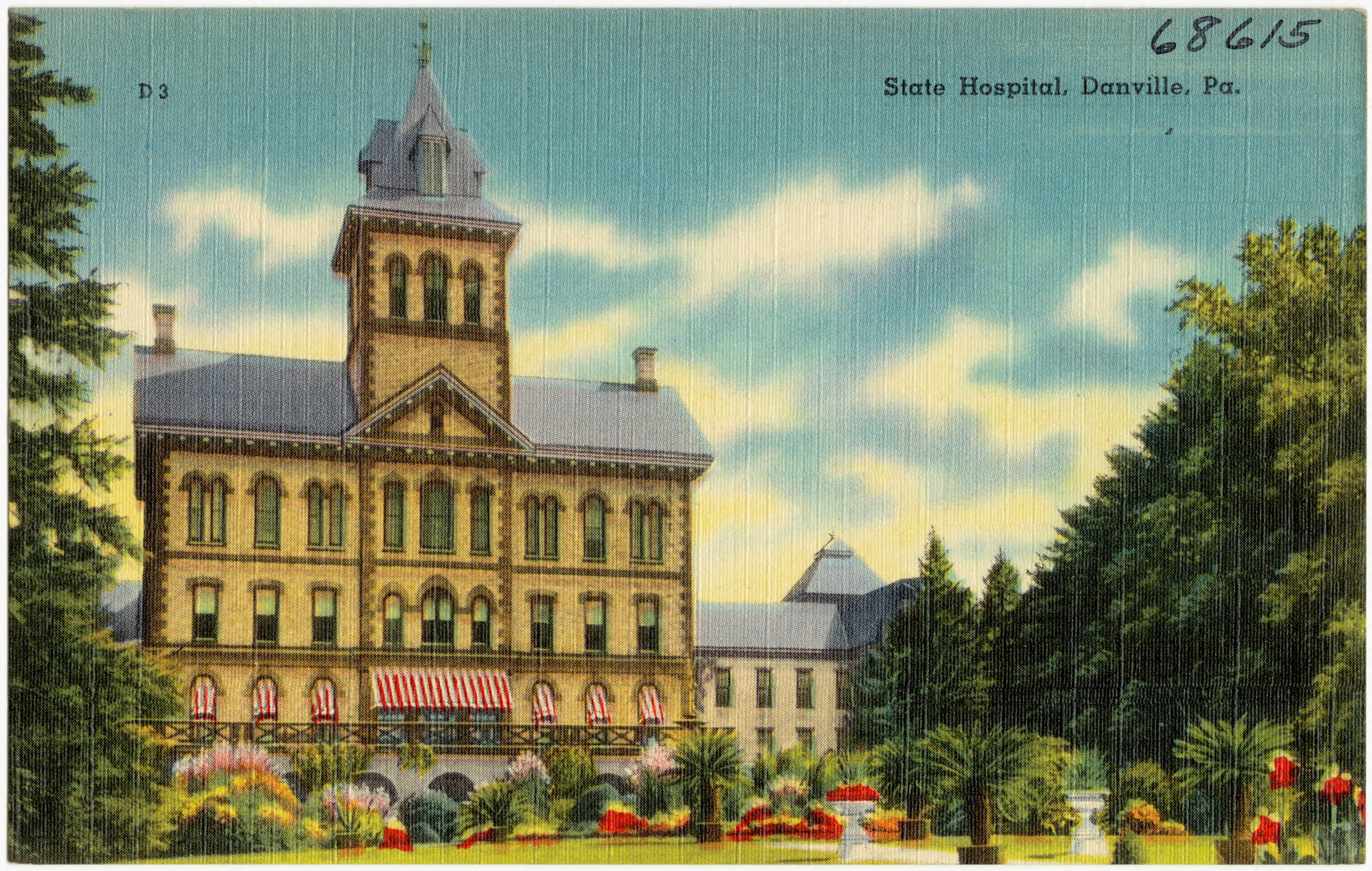
- State hospital, Danville, Pennsylvania, between 1930 and 1945

Geography
- Location: Danville, Pennsylvania, United States
- Coordinates: 40.949°N 76.596°W

Organization
- Type: Psychiatric

Links
- Website: Danville State Hospital
- Lists: Hospitals in Pennsylvania
Danville State Hospital
- Interactive map of the Danville State Hospital area
General information
- Construction started: April 13, 1868
- Opened: 1869
- Renovated: 1881
Technical details
- Material: Brick, stone, stucco
Design and construction
- Architect: John McArthur Jr.

Danville State Hospital in Danville, Pennsylvania is a mental health facility operated by the Pennsylvania Department of Public Welfare. It was Pennsylvania's third public facility to house the mentally ill and disabled.

== History ==
Danville State Hospital for the mentally ill, located one mile (1.6 km) southeast of Danville, Pennsylvania, opened in 1872 as the "State Hospital for the Insane at Danville". The hospital's Main Building, which was designed by John McArthur Jr., was a Kirkbride Plan hospital building. By September 30, 1873, 138 male and 72 female patients had been admitted for treatment. The land on which Danville State Hospital stands today was originally a tract owned by pioneer Daniel Montgomery, co-founder (with his father) of Danville and for whom the town was named. The 250 acres (1.0 km^{2}) were bought for $26,600 and Danville citizens backed the project by contributing $16,123.12 of that total.

Nine years after the new hospital opened its doors to patients it experienced a large scale fire which completely gutted the interior of the administration section, all of the female wards, and part of the male wards. The fire happened on March 5, 1881, between 8 and 9 pm on a Saturday evening. Reportedly, the fire was said to have originated from an explosion of gas in one of the rooms on the second floor of the female wing. Rebuilding the hospital would take another five years. During the rebuilding, the male wards that were not damaged by the fire remained open.

Between 1900 and the 1950s, additional land was purchased and many new buildings were constructed. The hospital received full approval of the Central Inspection Board of the American Psychiatric Association for excellence in patient care. The patient population showed a steady increase up to November 1955, when the figure reached 2,801. Since that time, a gradual planned reduction has occurred. As a result, the census in 1968 was 1,899, and on June 30, 2002, the hospital census stood at 147. This is in keeping with the modern philosophy of treating patients in the least restrictive setting. In 1976, a Long Term Care Facility (Licensed Nursing Home) was opened to address the needs of geriatric patients who no longer were considered to be in need of psychiatric care. The Long Term Care Facility closed on May 12, 1998.

Since 1985, this hospital has had full accreditation from JCAHO, Medicare, and Medical Assistance. The last JCAHO Survey was March 2003, and received a three-year accreditation.

As of January 31, 2008, Danville State Hospital had 163 patients.

== Notable patients ==
- Edith May (1827–1903), pseudonym of American poet Anne Drinker

== See also ==
- Kirkbride Plan
- Danville, Pennsylvania
- List of hospitals in Pennsylvania
