= Wernersville, Pennsylvania =

Borough in Pennsylvania, US

- Borough
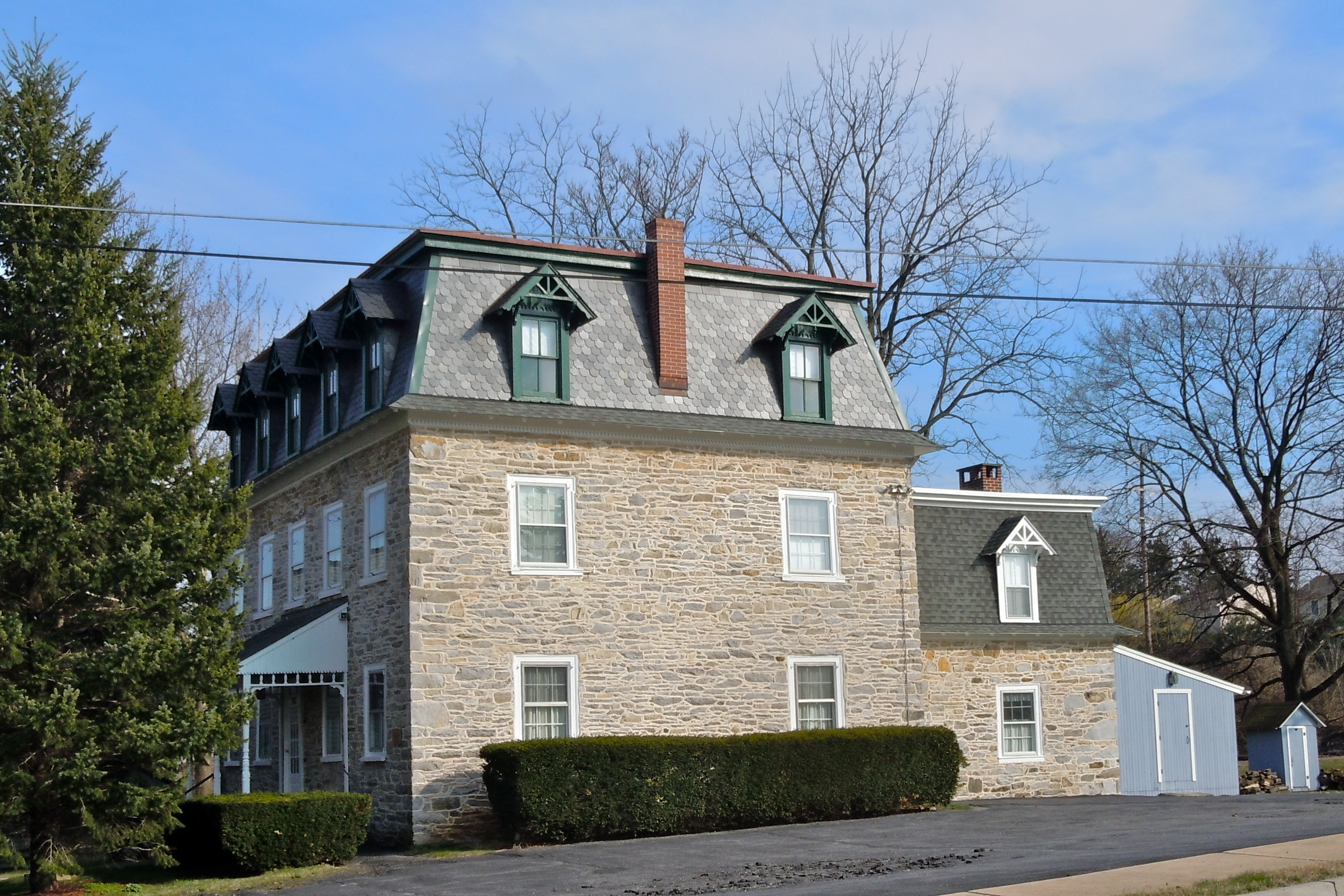
- The Lerch Tavern, a historic site on Penn Avenue in Wernersville in 2011

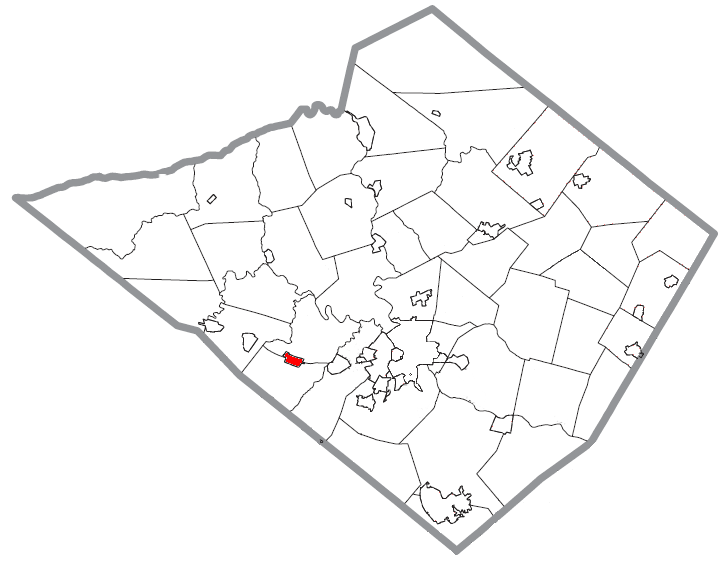
- Location in of Wernersville in Berks County, Pennsylvania

- Location in Pennsylvania Location in the United States
- Coordinates: 40°19′48″N 76°04′51″W
- Country: United States
- State: Pennsylvania
- County: Berks

Area
  - Total: 0.75 sq mi (1.95 km^{2})
  - Land: 0.75 sq mi (1.95 km^{2})
  - Water: 0 sq mi (0.00 km^{2})
- Elevation: 387 ft (118 m)

Population (2020)
  - Total: 2,776
  - Estimate (2019): 2,799
  - Density: 3,726.5/sq mi (1,438.82/km^{2})
- Time zone: UTC-5 (EST)
  - Summer (DST): UTC-4 (EDT)
- ZIP Code: 19565
- Area codes: 610 and 484
- FIPS code: 42-82296
- Website: www.wernersvilleborough.org

Wernersville is a borough in Berks County, Pennsylvania, United States. The population was 2,776 at the 2020 census.

== Geography ==
Wernersville is located at 40°19′48″N 76°4′51″W (40.329941, -76.080701).

== History ==
In the late 19th century and early 20th century, Wernersville was a noted resort community. City dwellers (especially from Philadelphia and New York City) traveled out to Wernersville, a stop on the Reading Railroad to rest and partake of the cool mountain air of South Mountain. A number of large resort hotels were erected for this purpose including Galen Hall, Bynden Wood, Grand View and the Highland Hotel. Some were advertised as sanatoriums, specializing in rest cures for illnesses such as tuberculosis. The most famous of these was Dr. Robert Walter's Mountain Park (aka Walters Park). Most of these resort hotels have since disappeared due to fire, demolition, or have been transformed into buildings for institutional purposes. Some cottages once associated with the resorts are now private homes.

In 1891, the Wernersville State Hospital opened as the State Asylum for the Chronic Insane. The original hospital buildings remain standing and the State Hospital is still active.

Wernersville was once the location of the Jesuit Novitiate and Juniorate of St Isaac Jogues for the Society's Maryland Province, before the novitiates of the New York, Maryland and eventually New England provinces merged and it was relocated in 1993 to Syracuse, New York. As the numbers of religious declined and the Juniorate wing was closed, half of the large building was dedicated around 1974 to a Spiritual Center for retreats for lay people. But, again as religious numbers further declined, the Center took over the entire building. However in August 2021, the Spiritual Center closed. In March 2023, the Phoebe Center bought the entire property for senior living at all degrees: independent, full-care etc. in the current building as well as in newly constructed cottages. A Jesuit cemetery remains on the grounds.

The Lerch Tavern and Wertz Mill are listed on the National Register of Historic Places.

== Transportation ==
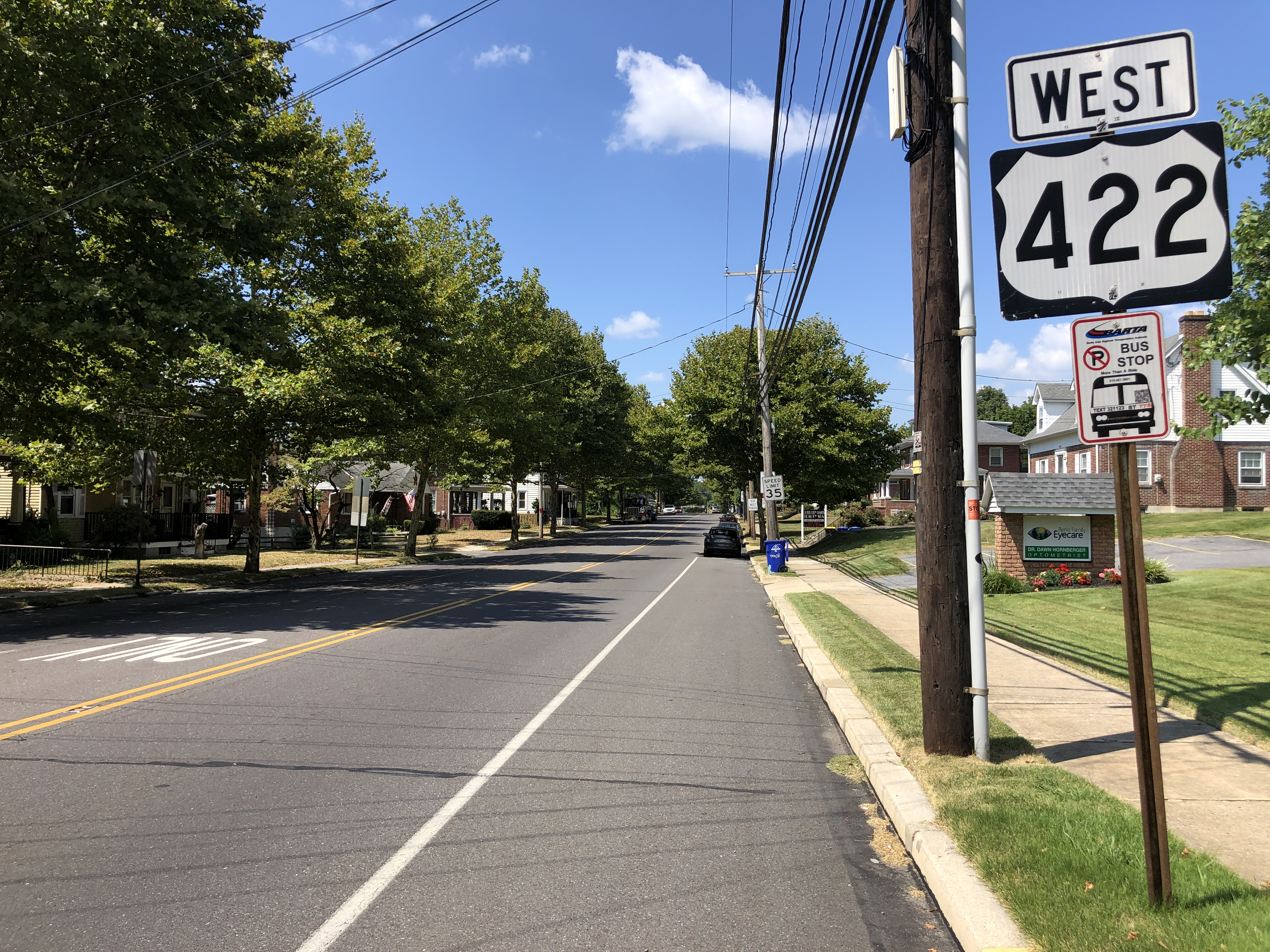
US 422 westbound in Wernersville

As of 2008, there were 11.45 miles (18.43 km) of public roads in Wernersville, of which 2.56 miles (4.12 km) were maintained by the Pennsylvania Department of Transportation (PennDOT) and 8.89 miles (14.31 km) were maintained by the borough.

U.S. Route 422 is the only numbered highway serving Wernersville. It follows a northwest-southeast alignment through the borough via Penn Avenue.

== Demographics ==
As of the 2000 census, there were 2,150 people, 843 households, and 558 families living in the borough. The population density was 2,690.3 inhabitants per square mile (1,038.7/km^{2}). There were 870 housing units at an average density of 1,088.6 per square mile (420.3/km^{2}). The racial makeup of the borough was 97.77% White, 0.84% African American, 0.23% Native American, 0.23% Asian, 0.28% from other races, and 0.65% from two or more races. Hispanic or Latino of any race were 0.88% of the population.

Historical population
Census	Pop.	Note	%±
1920	797		—
1930	1,096		37.5%
1940	1,160		5.8%
1950	1,280		10.3%
1960	1,462		14.2%
1970	1,761		20.5%
1980	1,811		2.8%
1990	1,934		6.8%
2000	2,150		11.2%
2010	2,494		16.0%
2020	2,776		11.3%

There were 843 households, out of which 27.9% had children under the age of 18 living with them, 55.2% were married couples living together, 7.4% had a female householder with no husband present, and 33.7% were non-families. 28.2% of all households were made up of individuals, and 10.2% had someone living alone who was 65 years of age or older. The average household size was 2.37 and the average family size was 2.92.

In the borough the population was spread out, with 20.6% under the age of 18, 6.0% from 18 to 24, 30.8% from 25 to 44, 21.3% from 45 to 64, and 21.3% who were 65 years of age or older. The median age was 41 years. For every 100 females there were 96.5 males. For every 100 females age 18 and over, there were 94.5 males.

The median income for a household in the borough was $45,605, and the median income for a family was $54,103. Males had a median income of $37,917 versus $25,192 for females. The per capita income for the borough was $21,858. About 3.4% of families and 4.4% of the population were below the poverty line, including 8.6% of those under age 18 and 5.5% of those age 65 or over.
