= Pennsylvania Department of Human Services =

State agency of the United States

Agency overview
- Formed: As the Pennsylvania Department of Public Welfare
- Jurisdiction: State government of Pennsylvania
- Annual budget: $20,020,564 (FY 2010)
- Agency executive: Val Arkoosh, Secretary of Human Services
- Website: https://www.pa.gov/agencies/dhs.html

The Pennsylvania Department of Human Services is a state agency in Pennsylvania tasked to provide care and support to vulnerable citizens. With a range of program offices, the department administers various services including eligibility determination, foster care, early childhood development, services for individuals with disabilities, long-term living programs, and management of healthcare programs. The department consists of executive offices and seven program offices:

- Office of Child Development and Early Learning
- Office of Children, Youth and Families
- Office of Developmental Programs
- Office of Income Maintenance
- Office of Long-Term Living
- Office of Medical Assistance Programs
- Office of Mental Health and Substance Abuse Services

== Juvenile corrections ==
Juvenile corrections fall under the purview of the Bureau of Juvenile Justice Services (BJJS), which oversees Pennsylvania's facilities for adjudicated delinquent youth. These facilities, known as "youth development centers," serve as correctional institutions for juveniles.

The department operates several facilities and forestry camps:

- Loysville Youth Development Center (LYDC) - Tyrone Township, Perry County.
- North Central Secure Treatment Unit (NCSTU) - On the grounds of Danville State Hospital.
- South Mountain Secure Treatment Unit (South Mountain).
- Youth Forestry Camp #2 - Hickory Run State Park.
- Youth Forestry Camp #3 - Trough Creek State Park.

Some former facilities include the New Castle Youth Development Center (NCYDC) - Shenango Township, Lawrence County - and the Cresson Secure Treatment Unit (CSTU), which is no longer operational. As of October 1995, the juvenile facilities were operating at overcapacity.

The Pennsylvania Department of Human Services is committed to fulfilling its mission of serving and protecting the welfare of individuals and families in Pennsylvania.

== See also ==
- List of Pennsylvania state agencies
