= Mary Virginia McCormick =

American philanthropist (1861–1941)

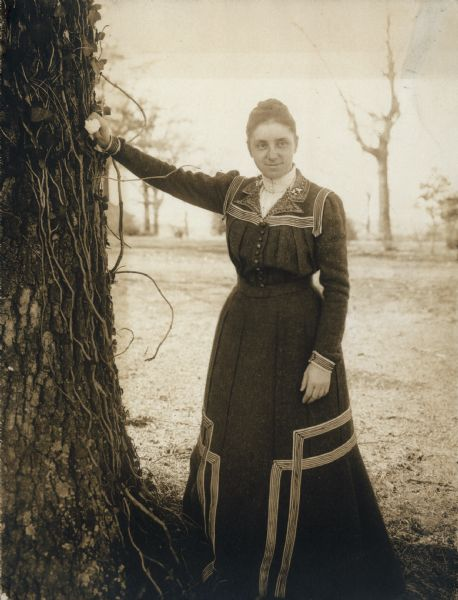
- Photograph of Mary V. McCormick, 1901
- Born: Mary Virginia McCormick; May 5, 1861; Chicago, Illinois, U.S.
- Died: May 24, 1941 (aged 80); Los Angeles, California, U.S.
- Resting place: Graceland Cemetery, Chicago
- Parent(s): Cyrus Hall McCormick; Nancy Fowler McCormick
- Relatives: See McCormick family

Mary Virginia McCormick (May 5, 1861 – May 24, 1941) was a wealthy American philanthropist who donated to humanitarian causes in the United States and Canada in the early twentieth century. She was a member of the McCormick family and had schizophrenia and a reclusive lifestyle.

== Biography ==
=== Childhood and adolescence ===
Born in Chicago, Illinois, on May 5, 1861, Mary Virginia McCormick was the eldest daughter of Nancy Maria "Nettie" Fowler McCormick and Cyrus Hall McCormick, the American inventor of the mechanical reaper and industrialist who founded the McCormick Harvesting Machine Company in 1847. Mary was the couple's second child, born two years after her brother, Cyrus McCormick Jr.

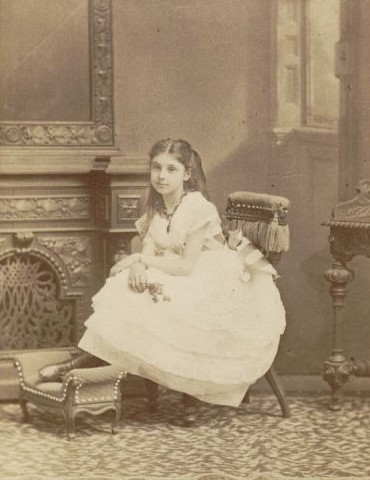
Mary Virginia McCormick, circa 1872

In July 1862, she sailed with her family across the Atlantic aboard the SS Scotia to Liverpool, England. She lived with her mother in London while her father toured the United Kingdom, France and Germany to exhibit his farming invention. The McCormicks returned to the United States in 1864. By mid-November they occupied a second-floor suite at the Fifth Avenue Hotel in New York City.

While staying at the hotel, Mary and her older brother were infected with scarlet fever, an illness that took the life of their younger brother, Robert Fowler McCormick, on January 6, 1865.

At the age of five, Mary lived at 40 Fifth Avenue in Lower Manhattan after her father purchased the residential property for the family in November 1866.

The McCormicks settled in Chicago after the Great Chicago Fire in October 1871, residing at 62 North Sheldon Street until the spring of 1875 and then moving to a house on 363 Superior Street. Although Mary McCormick was educated by private tutors and stayed at private boarding schools away from home, she attended Central High School, a Chicago public school on Monroe Street. In her early teenage years, she displayed musical talent and became a skilled pianist.

When the McCormicks visited Europe in the summer of 1878, the family addressed her thereafter by her middle name, Virginia. In August, she vacationed with her mother at St. Moritz, a Swiss town near the Albula Alps, while her father featured the reaper at the World's Fair in Paris. The pair then rejoined the family at the French capital in October and stayed at the Hôtel du Jardin, across from the Tuileries Garden. Mary remained with her parents and younger siblings in Paris until mid-April 1879 to care for her father as he recovered from a malignant carbuncle on the back of his neck. During her stay, she visited museums, historic places, the French opera, performances by stage actress Sarah Bernhardt and a mass at Notre-Dame Cathedral with church music led by composer Charles Gounod.

The family returned to the United States in the summer of 1879. When the McCormicks moved into their new Chicago mansion on Rush Street in late November, Mary was at a boarding school in New York.

=== Mental illness ===
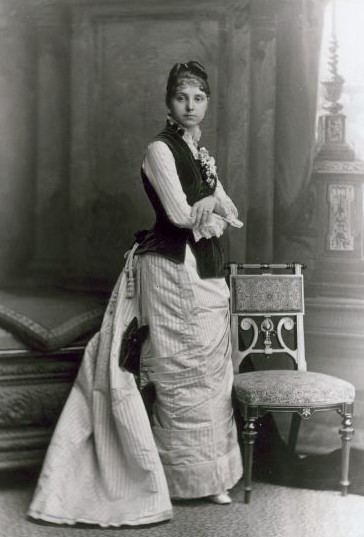
Mary Virginia McCormick, circa 1890

Mary McCormick exhibited signs of anxiety that worsened throughout her teenage years. By the age of 18, she expressed delusional ideas and hallucinated. She had frequent bouts of weeping and frantic praying. Episodes of insomnia were marked with incidents of her climbing out of windows and wandering around at night.

At the age of 19, she was diagnosed by doctors with dementia praecox. Because of her medical diagnosis, doctors declared her insane and mentally incompetent in 1880. Her condition became worse after the death of her father on May 13, 1884. The following August, she stayed at Clayton Lodge, the McCormick family estate in Richfield Springs, New York, and after Christmas, her mother brought her to Philadelphia, Pennsylvania to seek treatment under the care of Dr. Silas Weir Mitchell, a neurologist.

By 1889, she occupied a camp in the Adirondack Mountains of upstate New York and a house on the Upper West Side of Manhattan near the Hudson River, two dwellings that were provided by her mother who had employed a resident physician and household attendants to care for her. Grace Thorne Walker, a Canadian-born business secretary for the McCormick family, was the head of Mary McCormick's household and served as her nursing companion. Cyrus McCormick Jr. negotiated a three-year contract to recruit Dr. Alice Bennett, a superintendent at the Norristown State Hospital for the Insane, as Mary McCormick's attending physician in 1896, but Bennett resigned two years later after resident nurses accused her of morphine addiction.

=== Mid-life in the United States and Canada ===
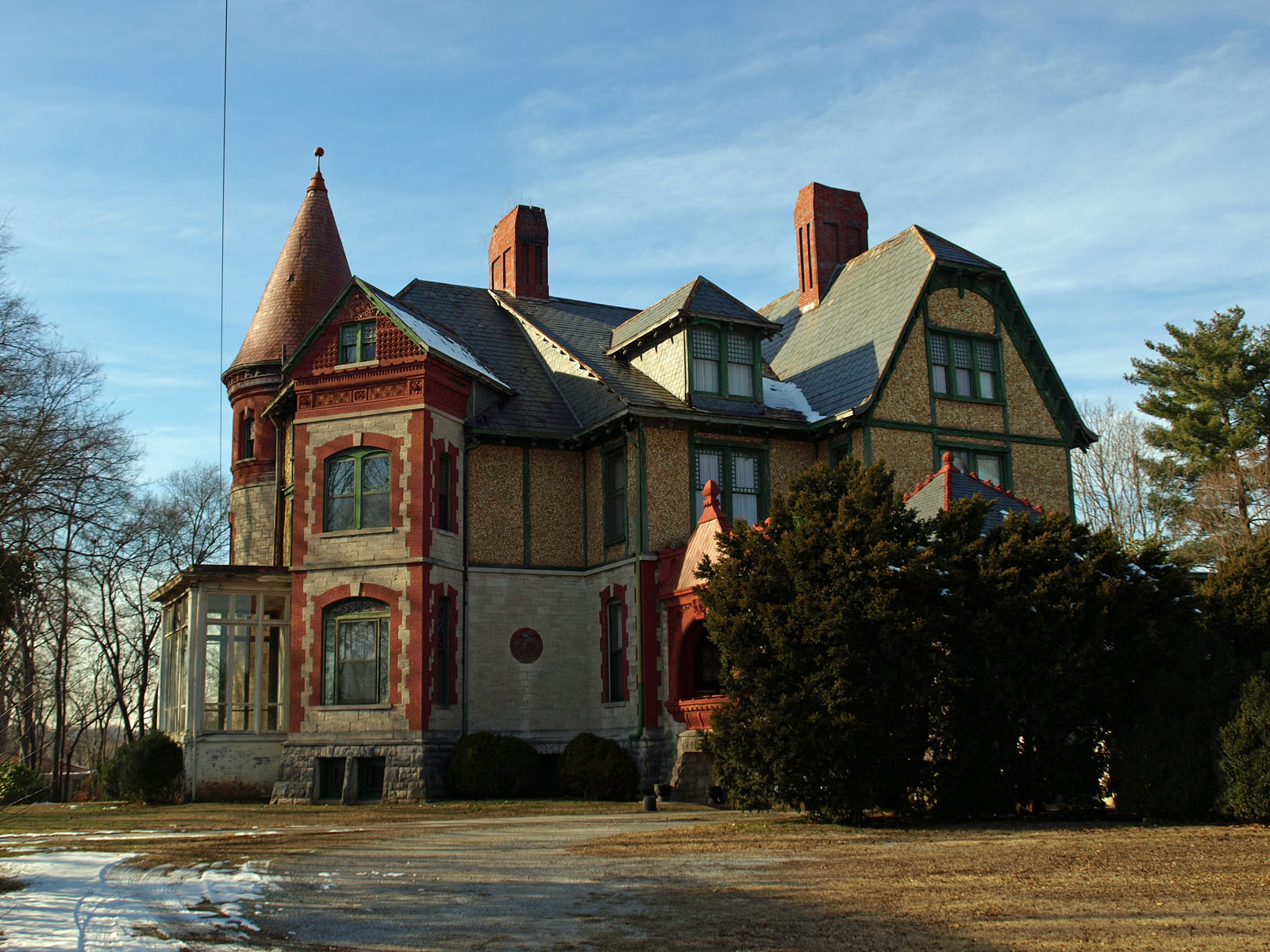
Kildare manor in Huntsville, Alabama

In 1897, Mary McCormick moved to the family estate at Riven Rock in Montecito, California and lived there until 1904. She stayed in Asheville, North Carolina in the summer of 1898, which became her winter residence.

The Kildare manor near Oakwood Avenue in Huntsville, Alabama, then became her winter home after her mother purchased the property from industrialist Michael Joseph O'Shaughnessy in 1900. She kept a small herd of deer on the estate and maintained a dairy that provided free milk to underprivileged children in Huntsville. On May 5 of each year, an outdoor festival was held on the grounds of her manor for hundreds of invited schoolchildren to celebrate her birthday.

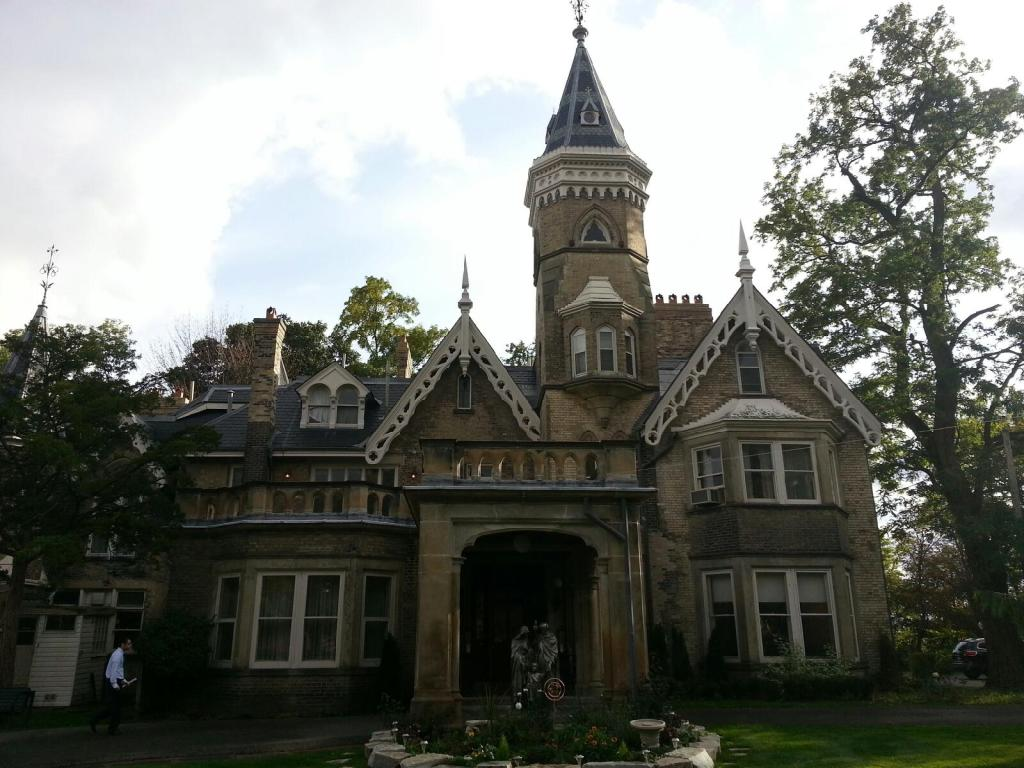
Oaklands manor in Toronto, Ontario

Mary McCormick visited Canada in 1904 and remained in Toronto for months. She noticed the Oaklands manor on Avenue Road during her stay and her family bought the property from the family of Senator John Macdonald in November 1905 as a summer residence for her. By 1908, she occupied the estate where her home held indoor gatherings for the Young Women's Christian Association (YWCA), the Woman's Christian Temperance Union (WCTU) and the Women's Christian Medical College. The grounds of her manor held outdoor garden parties every June that raised funds for the benefit of the Girl Guides of Canada, the Toronto General Hospital and the Home and School Association of Brown Public School on Avenue Road. In June 1916, her estate had the largest fête ever held in Canada, a four-day festival that was opened by Ontario Premier William Hearst for the Canadian Red Cross Society at the mid-point of the First World War.

She visited Cohasset, Massachusetts, in 1910 and leased the Caravels manor on Nichols Road. Fond of music herself, she accommodated musicians from the Boston Symphony Orchestra during her stay at the manor that year. Her family then acquired the property from industrialist Albert Cameron Burrage the following year as her seaside residence. The Caravels manor served as a layover during her travels between Huntsville and Toronto as the McCormicks made annual family visits to Cohasset at the end of June.

=== Later life in California and death ===
After the death of her mother on July 5, 1923, Mary McCormick moved back to California in 1924. The property at 1400 Hillcrest Avenue in Pasadena was purchased by the McCormicks from the family of oil magnate Frank Whitney Emery as her primary residence. She was placed under the care of Dr. Adolf Meyer, a psychiatrist who was retained in 1927 for five years by her younger sister, Anita McCormick Blaine.

In 1928, the McCormick family acquired a cliffside property in Los Angeles on Alma Real Drive in the Huntington Palisades community near Santa Monica that became her summer home known as the Quelindo manor. Her estate in Toronto was sold to the Brothers of the Christian Schools in 1931 for the purpose of establishing a campus for De La Salle College and her manor in Huntsville was sold at auction in 1932 and became a hotel that year.

She hired symphony orchestras to play for her and kept three musicians among her retinue of 30 household servants as she divided her time between the two California estates. In May 1938, she was ill at the Quelindo manor and unable to attend the wedding of her younger brother, Harold Fowler McCormick, to his nurse, Adah Wilson, that was held at her other home in Pasadena.

Bedridden by an illness in her final three months, Mary McCormick died at the Quelindo manor on May 24, 1941, at the age of 80. Her belongings in California were sold at auction and her net worth, after all inheritance taxes and expenses had been deducted, was US$6,550,802 in 1942 (equivalent to US$101,920,681 in 2025). She was buried with other members of the McCormick family at Graceland Cemetery in Chicago.

== Philanthropy ==
Mary McCormick was endowed with a trust fund that afforded her with the means to support social activities and charitable causes. In 1904, she provided the first settlement house in Huntsville with the opening of Virginia Hall, a fifteen-room community center situated in West Huntsville. In Toronto, her donation to the YWCA allowed the charity to open the YWCA Cafeteria in August 1910, a downtown restaurant at 209 Yonge Street that offered affordable meals for women.

She pledged a donation to the Toronto Playgrounds Association in 1910 for the purpose of equipping a children's playground in the city. Cottingham Square, a public square near her Toronto home, was the original location for the playground but it was too close in proximity to the Canadian Pacific Railway line. The land of the former Grand National Rink on Brock Avenue was purchased by the city of Toronto in December 1910 which then became the site for the McCormick Playground in July 1911. Her mother and Toronto Mayor George Reginald Geary opened the McCormick Recreation Centre in September 1912 on the site of the playground at 163 Brock Avenue, a venue where Mary McCormick held annual Christmas parties for 400 children and their parents. The total of her contribution to the Toronto Playgrounds Association was CA$25,000 (equivalent to CA$648,438 in 2025).

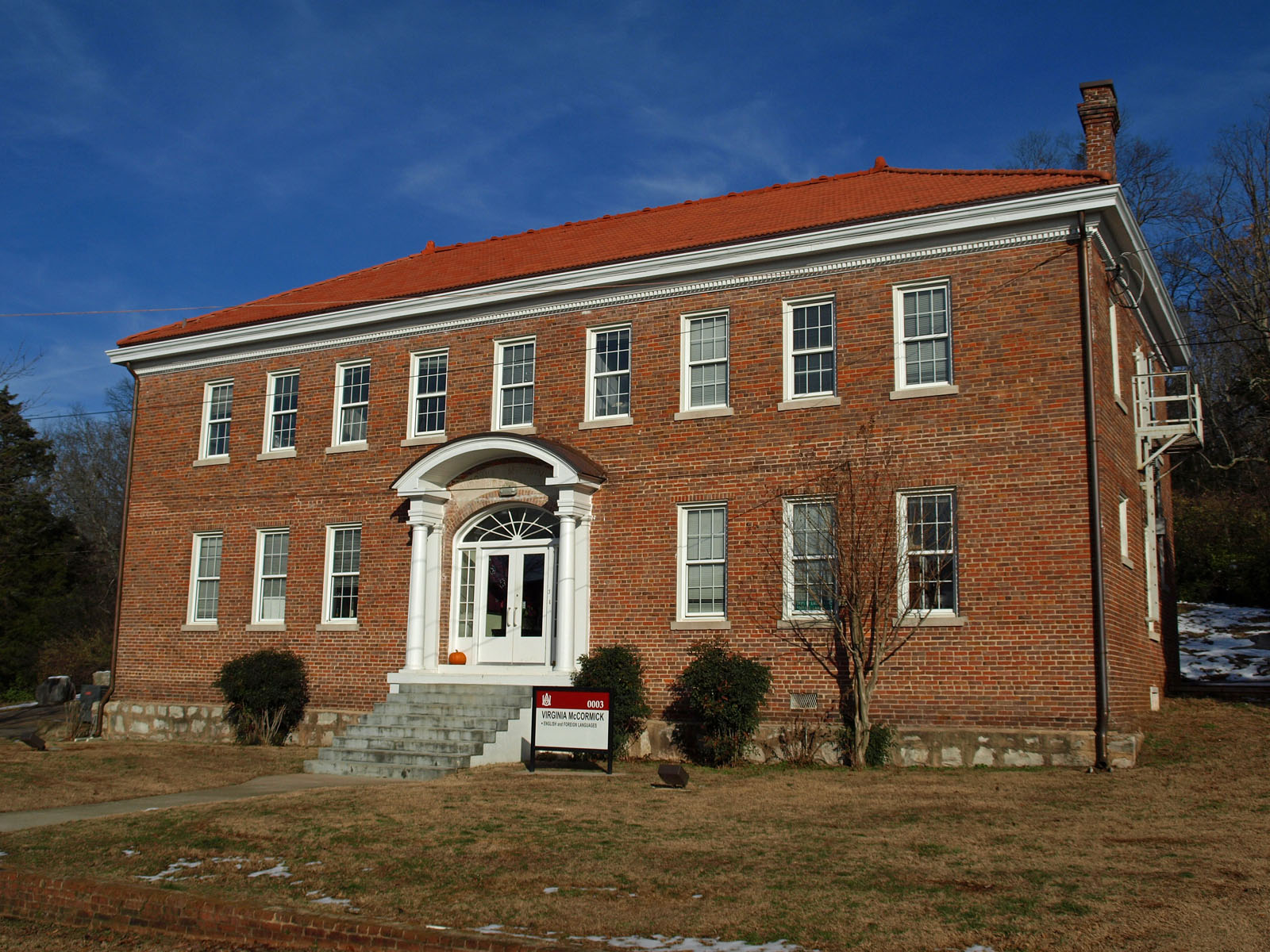
Virginia McCormick Hospital later became Virginia McCormick Hall at Alabama A&M University

During the Jim Crow era of racial segregation in the Southern United States, Mary McCormick funded the construction of a hospital in 1911 at the Alabama State Agricultural and Mechanical College, a black college in Normal, Alabama. The Virginia McCormick Hospital cost US$10,000 to build (equivalent to US$345,536 in 2025) and it was the only hospital for African Americans in Madison County when it opened. She also contributed US$19,000 in the same year (equivalent to US$656,518 in 2025) to erect the Councill Domestic Sciences Building on the campus, named after the college's founder William Hooper Councill, an educator who was a former slave. In February 1916, she donated US$5,000 (equivalent to US$147,936 in 2025) to open a black hospital annex of the Huntsville Infirmary, an eight-room building that was furnished by her household servants and located across the street in downtown Huntsville from the segregated white hospital.

Her other acts of charity included a sum of US$17,500 to the Young Men's Christian Association (YMCA) of Huntsville in 1912 (equivalent to US$583,836 in 2025), which allowed the Central YMCA to open on Greene Street in February 1912 and the West Huntsville YMCA to open on Eighth Avenue in 1915. She contributed US$3,000 in 1916 (equivalent to US$88,761 in 2025) to erect the West Huntsville School, an eight-room wooden schoolhouse on Ninth Street.

Mary McCormick supported the Canadian war effort during the First World War by giving CA$1,500 to the Canadian Red Cross Society in 1916 (equivalent to CA$36,761 in 2025), CA$5,000 to the YMCA Red Triangle Fund in 1918 (equivalent to CA$92,247 in 2025) and 200 pairs of socks to the Ontario Red Cross Sock Fund.

== Legacy ==
Landmarks with her namesake include the following:

- Mary McCormick Recreation Centre at 66 Sheridan Avenue in Toronto, a municipal recreation facility that replaced the McCormick Recreation Centre at 163 Brock Avenue in 1964 and named originally as the McCormick Recreation Centre until 2001.

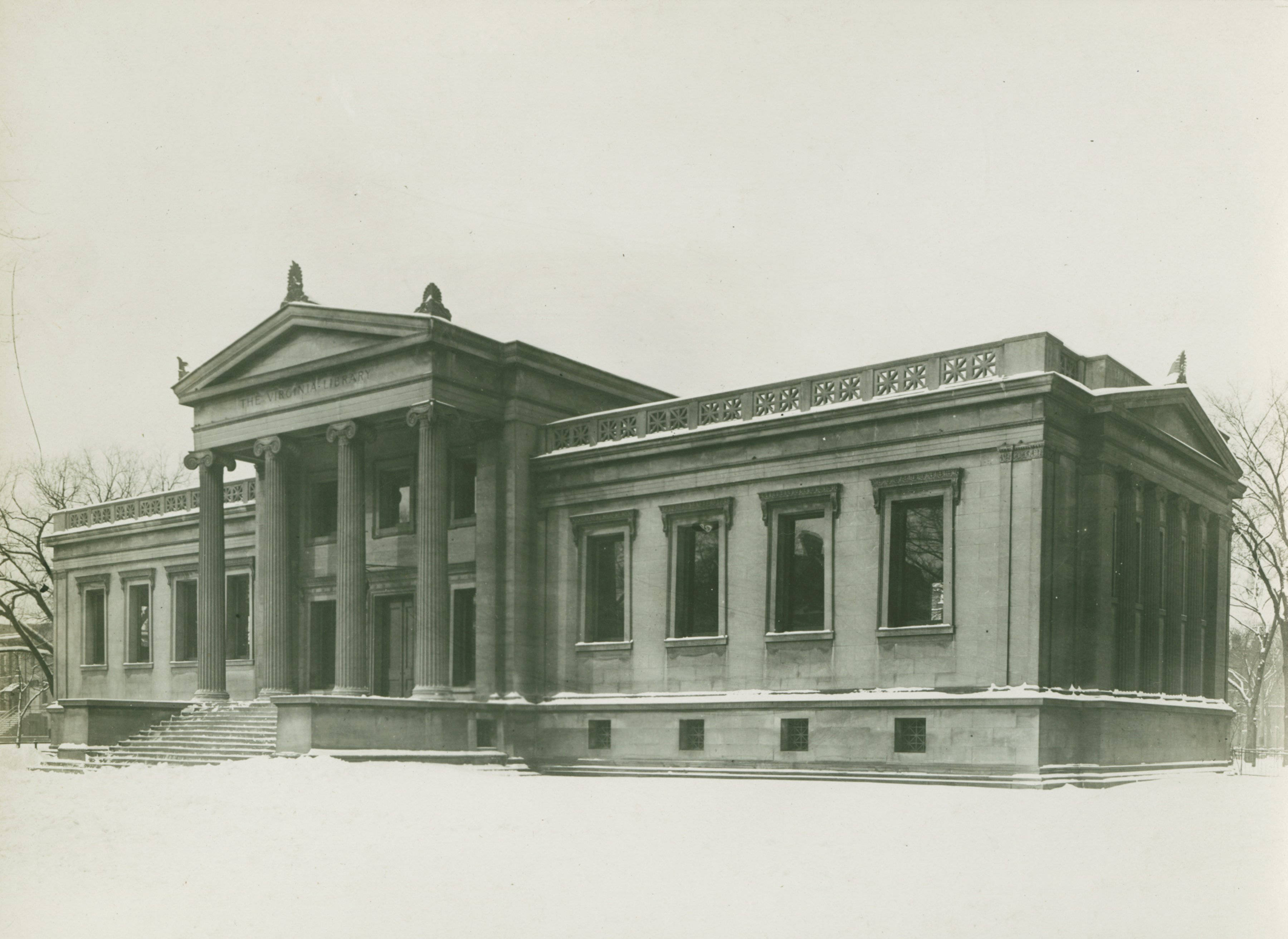
Virginia Library at the McCormick Theological Seminary in Chicago

- McCormick Park in Toronto, a municipal park in Brockton Village that was named originally as the McCormick Playground in 1911 until 1963.
- McCormick Playground Arena at 179 Brock Avenue in Toronto, a municipal indoor ice arena that opened in 1972.
- McCormick YMCA at 3214 Eighth Avenue in Huntsville, opened from 1915 to 1983.
- Virginia Hall at 60 Shiloh Road at Tusculum University in Greeneville, Tennessee, opened in 1901 as the first dormitory for women at the college.
- Virginia Library at 826 Belden Avenue in Chicago, an academic library at the McCormick Theological Seminary from 1896 to 1963.
- Virginia McCormick Hall at 308 Buchanan Way at Alabama A&M University in Normal, Alabama, first opened as the Virginia McCormick Hospital from 1911 to 1927.

== Print sources ==
- Casson, Herbert N. (1909). Cyrus Hall McCormick: His Life and Work. Chicago: A.C. McClurg & Company.
- Ellis, Diane; Drost, Maureen (Summer–Fall 2002). "Mr. O'Shaughnessy's Dream House" (PDF). Historic Huntsville Quarterly. 28 (2 & 3): 13–22.
- Fields, Armond (2003). Katharine Dexter McCormick: Pioneer For Women's Rights. Westport, Connecticut: Praeger Publishers. ISBN 978-0275980047.
- Hutchison, William T. (1935). Cyrus Hall McCormick: Harvest, 1856–1884. Vol. 2. New York City: D. Appleton-Century Company.
- Noll, Richard (1999). "Styles of Psychiatric Practice, 1906–1925: Clinical Evaluations of the Same Patient by James Jackson Putnam, Adolph Meyer, August Hoch, Emil Kraepelin and Smith Ely Jelliffe". History of Psychiatry. 10 (38 Pt 2): 145–189. doi:10.1177/0957154X9901003801. PMID 11623876. S2CID 34823163.
- Pruitt, Raneé G., ed. (2005). Eden of the South: A Chronology of Huntsville, Alabama, 1805–2005 (PDF). Huntsville: Huntsville-Madison County Public Library. ISBN 0-9707368-2-7.
- Record, James (1978). A Dream Come True: The Story of Madison County and Incidentally of Alabama and the United States (PDF). Vol. 2. Huntsville, Alabama: John Hicklin Printing Company.
- Roderick, Stella Virginia (1956). Nettie Fowler McCormick. Rindge, New Hampshire: Richard R. Smith Publisher, Inc.
- Rosenberg, Chaim M. (2019). The International Harvester Company: A History of the Founding Families and Their Machines. Jefferson, North Carolina: McFarland and Company. ISBN 978-1476677095.
