= McCormick Park =

Public park in Toronto, Ontario, Canada

- Location within Toronto
- Type: Municipal Park
- Location: 66 Sheridan Avenue; Toronto, Ontario, Canada
- Coordinates: 43°38′48.1654″N 79°26′0.4106″W
- Area: 1.5 hectares (3.7 acres)
- Created: 1911
- Owner: City of Toronto
- Operator: Toronto Parks
- Website: McCormick Park

McCormick Park is a municipal park and recreational area at 66 Sheridan Avenue in the Brockton Village neighbourhood enclave of Little Portugal in Toronto, Ontario, Canada. Opened in 1911 as the McCormick Playground on the property of the former Grand National Rink and changed later to its current name in 1963, McCormick Park is located in the vicinity of Dufferin Street and Dundas Street. It is bounded by Brock Avenue on the west, by Sheridan Avenue on the east, by Frankish Avenue on the north and by Middleton Street on the south.

The park covers an area of 1.5 hectares (3.7 acres) that features a baseball diamond, basketball courts, a wading pool and a children's playground. It is named after Mary Virginia McCormick, a Toronto resident who was the eldest daughter of American inventor Cyrus Hall McCormick. The Mary McCormick Recreation Centre at 66 Sheridan Avenue and the McCormick Playground Arena at 179 Brock Avenue are located at the north end of the park.

== History ==
=== Rinks and baseball field, 1896 to 1910 ===
McCormick Park is located on the grounds of the Grand National Rink, an open-air rink at 153 Brock Avenue that was owned by business merchant Andrew Wheeler Green from 1896 to 1902. Six years after the rink had closed, the north end of the site reopened in January 1908 as the Royal Alexandra Rink, an open-air hockey rink at 189 Brock Avenue. By the following April, the rink and its adjoining property, which spanned a total of 1.2 hectares (3.0 acres), became the grounds for a baseball field.

The Brock Avenue Rink opened on the site of the former Royal Alexandra Rink in December 1909 at 189 Brock Avenue. Construction of a permanent indoor hockey arena for the Toronto Professional Hockey Club was scheduled for the following year on the grounds of the baseball field but when the Canadian Hockey Association was dissolved on January 15, 1910, the plan to build the arena came to an end. The last known skating event at the Brock Avenue Rink was held in March 1910.

=== Toronto Playgrounds Association ===
On September 7, 1910, Mary Virginia McCormick donated CA$10,000 (equivalent to $285,154 in 2025) to the Toronto Playgrounds Association, an advocacy group formed in 1908 whose members worked together with the Toronto Parks Department to build children's playgrounds across the city. Cottingham Square, a municipal park with an area of 0.7 hectares (1.7 acres) that was situated near McCormick's home, was the original location for the playground but it was abandoned by the association because the site was too close in proximity to the Canadian Pacific Railway line.

The grounds of the former rink and baseball field on Brock Avenue were sold in November 1910 and subdivided into housing lots. Toronto City Council purchased 1.1 hectares (2.7 acres) of that land in the following month for $34,000 (equivalent to $969,522 in 2025) for the purpose of establishing a playground in the western end of the city. On March 3, 1911, the association accepted the new location and McCormick offered to provide an additional $5,000 (equivalent to $148,899 in 2025) to equip the playground. She provided further donations to the association that, by September 1912, the sum of her contributions was $25,000 (equivalent to $648,438 in 2025).

== Parkland ==
=== McCormick Playground, 1911 to 1963 ===
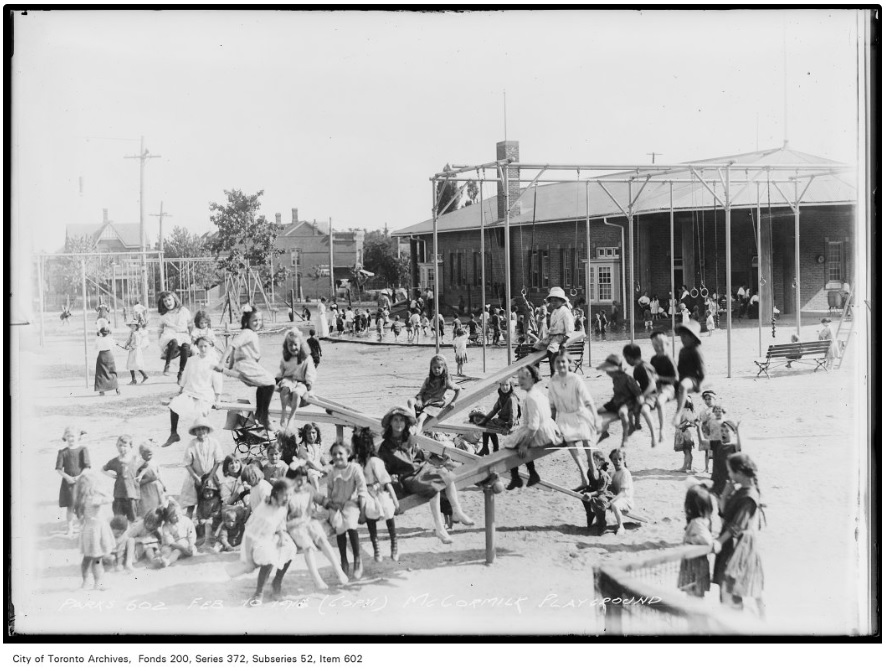
McCormick Playground, circa 1916

McCormick Playground at 163 Brock Avenue was opened with a public celebration on July 1, 1911. It featured climbing ladders, glider chairs, merry-go-rounds, sandboxes, seesaws, slides, swings and a large wading pool for children's amusement. There were ice rinks for hockey and skating for the winter season.

It was the third supervised children's playground on municipal property that was managed by the Toronto Playgrounds Association, after St. Andrew's Playground on Adelaide Street in 1909 and Osler Playground on Argyle Street in 1910. Emulating the playgrounds of the Chicago South Park Commission, it was the association's first playground to have an indoor recreation centre that operated all-year. It was the largest permanent playground in Toronto and its area grew in 1957 when Toronto City Council acquired an additional 0.41 hectares (1.0 acre) of adjacent land for $125,000 (equivalent to $1,386,824 in 2025).

After the Toronto Housing Authority opened the nearby McCormick Park Apartments at 1525 Dundas Street West in 1960, construction of a second recreation centre and an artificial ice rink on the enlarged playground began in 1963 and the McCormick Playground on Brock Avenue became McCormick Park at 66 Sheridan Avenue.

=== First McCormick Recreation Centre, 1912 to 1964 ===
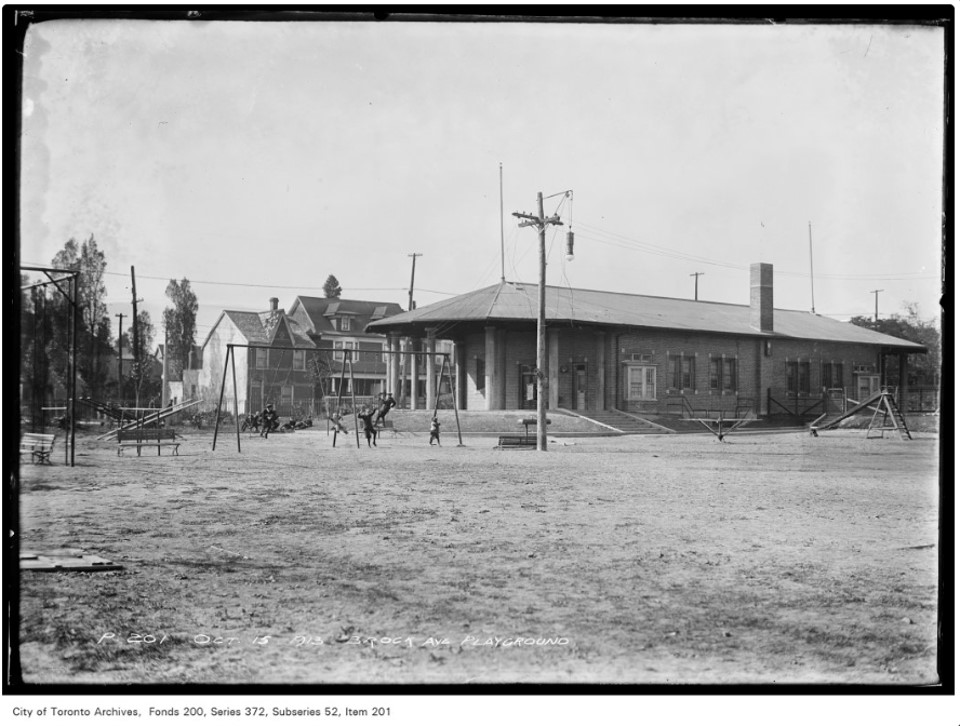
McCormick Recreation Centre and Playground on Brock Avenue, 1913

The McCormick Recreation Centre at 163 Brock Avenue was opened with a public festival on September 21, 1912. Mayor George Reginald Geary and McCormick's mother, Nancy Fowler McCormick, attended the inauguration. It featured a main hall that accommodated 300 people along with committee rooms and shower baths. The Georgian Revival building was the first year-round recreation centre in Canada and the largest permanent one in Toronto.

The Toronto Playgrounds Association managed the building and the adjoining playground until the responsibility was transferred over to the Toronto Parks Department in June 1913. The Toronto Public Health Department opened an infant clinic at the recreation centre in July 1914, one of 10 health clinics across the city where mothers brought their babies to the care of the attending doctors and nurses.

Its main hall was the setting for two wintertime minstrel shows. On December 28, 1916, the McCormick Playground Minstrels performed at a Christmas pageant in which 23 entertainers appeared in blackface theatrical makeup. The amateur minstrels staged another performance in blackface makeup on January 29, 1920.

During the First World War, Mary McCormick and her Canadian-born nursing companion, Grace Thorne Walker, held Christmas pageants for 400 children and their parents at the main hall in 1917 and 1918. In 1919, the recreation centre had an honour roll that listed the names of 162 of its men who were recruited in the war.

In 1921, the McCormick Recreation Centre attracted a total of 118,229 children to its facility, the largest number among the 1,059,213 children who had visited all 33 municipal recreation centres throughout the year. There were a total of 183,444 adults and children who registered with the recreation centre in 1933, the greatest share of the 2,018,509 visitors who had attended all 59 municipal playgrounds in Toronto.

In 1941, the recreation centre staged its annual children's gymnastics exhibition in the auditorium of Parkdale Collegiate Institute. Its exhibitions continued to be held at the public secondary school every year until 1962. The McCormick Recreation Centre on Brock Avenue was closed permanently in 1964.

=== Second McCormick Recreation Centre ===
==== McCormick Park Recreation Centre, 1964 to 2003 ====
The McCormick Park Recreation Centre at 66 Sheridan Avenue was opened on October 29, 1964. Located next to the original building, the second facility featured a gymnasium, an indoor swimming pool with a seating gallery for 500 people, a children's nursery and handicraft studios. Mayor Philip Givens and 700 people attended the inauguration.

The modernist-style building was the sixth municipal recreation centre that was built in the city since 1962 for $750,000 (equivalent to $7,509,146 in 2025). Crafts and fashion exhibitions by the Toronto Parks and Recreation Department were held at the facility from 1965 to 1966 and amateur boxing championships for boys were staged at its gym from 1965 to 1972.

On May 6, 1991, chlorine gas escaped from a ruptured cylinder pipe at the McCormick Park Recreation Centre and forced the building to close for 90 minutes. Before firefighters had capped the leaking cylinder, the surrounding area was sealed off by the police and 400 students from the nearby St. Veronica Catholic School and residents of 12 houses on Frankish Avenue were evacuated temporarily. Five police officers, two employees of the recreation centre and one teacher were treated for sore throats at Toronto Western Hospital and released on the same day.

==== Mary McCormick Recreation Centre ====
In 2001, the building underwent a major renovation estimated at $2,808,468 (equivalent to $4,715,240 in 2025) and Toronto City Council began referring to the facility as the Mary McCormick Recreation Centre. It was reopened officially as the Mary McCormick Recreation Centre on January 25, 2003.

=== McCormick Playground Arena ===
The McCormick Playground Arena at 179 Brock Avenue was opened on the sites of the original recreation centre and the Grand National Rink on March 14, 1972. It has been called the McCormick Arena but its official name is the McCormick Playground Arena in recognition of the McCormick Playground.

Built at an estimated cost of $542,980 (equivalent to $4,391,986 in 2025), the indoor municipal skating arena features two ice rinks and a community meeting room with a concession stand that is named the Nixon Room as a tribute to George Adam Nixon, a former member of the Legislative Assembly of Ontario who was elected to represent the Toronto riding of Dovercourt in 1971 and one of the first members who served on the arena's board of management. It is one of eight municipal skating arenas that is governed by an executive committee whose members are appointed by Toronto City Council.

In 1973, high concentrations of carbon monoxide were measured at the arena by the Ontario Ministry of Health after the gasoline-powered ice resurfacer had cleaned the ice rinks and the indoor air quality exceeded the minimum provincial health standard of 50 parts-per-million for an industrial building. The discovery had spurred the Toronto Parks and Recreation Department to replace all ice-resurfacing vehicles with other models that were not gasoline-powered and allow provincial health inspectors to monitor the air quality at all municipal skating arenas.

== Friends of McCormick Park ==
In 2012, neighbourhood residents formed the Friends of McCormick Park, an advocacy group whose members have worked together with the Toronto Parks, Forestry and Recreation Division to improve the amenities of the park. On September 27, 2014, McCormick Park was reopened with an updated children's playground that featured climbing boulders, a large jungle gym, a new merry-go-round and swings. The McCormick Park Café and Market, a café that offered food and beverages from a shipping container, was inaugurated on the same day, becoming the first cargo container eatery to open on the grounds of a municipal park in Toronto. One month later, a public bookcase registered with the Little Free Library was installed at the park.

== List of notable sports figures ==
- Louise Agoues, bronze medal fencer in the women's team foil at the 1967 Pan American Games who placed third in the women's foil at the Canadian Fencing Association Eastern Canada Championships at the McCormick Recreation Centre on April 30, 1972.
- Muhammad Ali, world heavyweight boxing champion who was a guest referee for the Metro Toronto Junior Boxing Championships at the McCormick Recreation Centre on March 21, 1966, eight days before his own boxing title match at Maple Leaf Gardens in Toronto.
- Akim Aliu, athlete of the Parkdale Flames Hockey Association at the McCormick Playground Arena who became a hockey player with the Calgary Flames in 2012.
- Kay Aoyama, Canadian women's fencing champion in 1971 who won the women's foil title at the Canadian Fencing Association Central Ontario Championships at the McCormick Recreation Centre on March 19, 1972.
- Vince Barton, athlete of the McCormick Recreation Centre who became a baseball player with the Chicago Cubs in 1931.
- Yank Boyd, athlete of the McCormick Recreation Centre who became a hockey player with the Detroit Red Wings in 1934.
- Gord Brydson, athlete of the McCormick Recreation Centre who became a golfer and won the Canadian Professional Golfers' Association Championship in 1944 and 1948.
- Bill Buchanan, athlete of the McCormick Recreation Centre who became a catcher with the Toronto Osler Baseball Club in 1918, a team that won the Toronto Playground League Championships for the following two years.
- Thomas Clarence Burt, athlete of the McCormick Recreation Centre and First World War veteran who became captain of the Toronto Osler Baseball Club in 1926.
- William Gladstone "Glad" Calhoun, coach of the Toronto Osler Baseball Club who became the general manager of the McCormick Recreation Centre from 1921 to 1948.
- Patrick Chan, athlete of the West Toronto Skating Club at the McCormick Playground Arena who became a gold medal figure skater at the 2018 Winter Olympics.
- George Chuvalo, Canadian heavyweight boxing champion who was a guest referee for the Toronto Junior Boxing Championships at the McCormick Recreation Centre on March 8 and 10, 1969.
- Hugh Crilly, athlete of the McCormick Recreation Centre who became an outfielder with the Toronto Osler Baseball Club from 1924 to 1926.
- Bert Donohue, athlete of the McCormick Recreation Centre who became captain of the Toronto Wellington Baseball Club in 1921, a team that won the Maple Leaf Dominion Championship for the next two years.
- Lori Dupuis, hockey player with the Brampton Thunder who won a gold medal in women's hockey at the 2002 Winter Olympics and played in a charity match for the Daily Bread Food Bank at the McCormick Playground Arena on April 8, 2006.
- William Alexander "Irish" Eagleson, athlete of the McCormick Recreation Centre and First World War veteran who became a short stop with Toronto Wellington Baseball Club in 1923 and an infielder with the Toronto Osler Baseball Club in 1927.
- Gillian Ferrari, hockey player with the Brampton Thunder who won a gold medal in women's hockey at the 2006 Winter Olympics and played in a charity match at the McCormick Playground Arena on April 8, 2006.
- Ron Finn, hockey linesman who encountered a playground trainer at the McCormick Recreation Centre and then married her before starting his career with the National Hockey League in 1969.
- Horace Gwynne, boxer who won a gold medal at the 1932 Summer Olympics and became the general manager of the McCormick Recreation Centre in 1964.
- Jayna Hefford, hockey player with the Brampton Thunder who won three Olympic gold medals in women's hockey and played in a charity match at the McCormick Playground Arena on April 8, 2006.
- Murray Henderson, athlete of the McCormick Recreation Centre who became a defenceman with the Boston Bruins in 1945.
- Donna Hennyey, bronze medal fencer in the women's team foil at the 1967 Pan American Games who won the women's foil title at the Canadian Fencing Association Eastern Canada Championships at the McCormick Recreation Centre on April 30, 1972.
- Alexander "Alec" Hill, athlete of the McCormick Recreation Centre who became an outfielder with the Toronto Wellington Baseball Club in 1922 and one of Toronto's top home run hitters in semi-professional baseball until 1930.
- Bertram John "Buck" Hughes, athlete of the McCormick Recreation Centre who became captain of the Toronto Olser Baseball Club from 1919 to 1921.
- Jordan Kyrou, athlete of the McCormick Playground Arena who became a hockey player with the St. Louis Blues in 2018.
- Don "Shanty" McKenzie, athlete of the McCormick Recreation Centre who became a football player with the Toronto Argonauts in 1940.
- Dylan Moscovitch, athlete with the Parkdale Flames Hockey Association and the West Toronto Skating Club at the McCormick Playground Arena who won a silver medal in figure skating at the 2014 Winter Olympics.
- Hank Nowak, winger for the Boston Bruins and the Detroit Red Wings who played a game of hockey with his son at the McCormick Playground Arena on December 1, 2023.
- Herbert Obst, Canadian men's foil champion in 1966 who placed second in the men's foil at the Canadian Fencing Association Eastern Canada Championships at the McCormick Recreation Centre on April 30, 1972.
- Doyle Orange, Canadian Football League Eastern All-Star running back for the Toronto Argonauts in 1975 who became a playground instructor at the McCormick Recreation Centre from 1978 to 1980.
- Peter Samek, bronze medal fencer in the men's team sabre at the 1967 Pan American Games who won the men's sabre title at the Canadian Fencing Association Eastern Canada Championships at the McCormick Recreation Centre on April 30, 1972.
- William Archibald "Hank" Sinclair, athlete of the McCormick Recreation Centre who became a football player with the Toronto Argonauts from 1924 to 1929.
- Joe Spring, athlete of the McCormick Recreation Centre and First World War veteran who became a pitcher with the Toronto Osler Baseball Club from 1919 to 1927.
- Eli Sukunda, fencer who won the men's sabre title at the Canadian Fencing Association Central Ontario Championships at the McCormick Recreation Centre on March 19, 1972 and became the men's sabre champion at the 1975 Canada Winter Games.
- Vicky Sunohara, hockey player with the Brampton Thunder who won a gold medal in women's hockey at the 2006 Winter Olympics and played in a charity match at the McCormick Playground Arena on April 8, 2006.
- Tessa Virtue, figure skating champion at the 2018 Winter Olympics who launched her new Barbie doll at the McCormick Playground Arena on March 9, 2020.
- Konrad Widmaier, Canadian men's épée champion in 1966 who won the men's foil title at the Canadian Fencing Association Eastern Canada Championships at the McCormick Recreation Centre on April 30, 1972.
- Gerry Wiedel, Canadian national fencing champion in 1965 who won the men's foil title at the Canadian Fencing Association Central Ontario Championships at the McCormick Recreation Centre on March 19, 1972.
- Ross Wilson, athlete of the McCormick Recreation Centre who became a goaltender with the Detroit Red Wings in 1951.
- Lester Wong, silver medal épée fencer at the 1970 British Commonwealth Games who won the men's épée title at the Canadian Fencing Association Eastern Canada Championships at the McCormick Recreation Centre on April 30, 1972.
