= Grand National Rink =

Former outdoor skating rink in Toronto, Ontario, Canada

- Address: 153 Brock Avenue
- Location: Toronto, Ontario
- Coordinates: 43°38′47.1654″N 79°26′3.4106″W
- Owner: Andrew Wheeler Green
- Opened: 1896
- Closed: 1902

The Grand National Rink was an outdoor skating rink located in the Brockton Village neighbourhood of Toronto, Ontario, Canada from 1896 to 1902. At the time, it was the largest open-air rink in the city. Its location is now the site of the McCormick Playground Arena at McCormick Park in the Little Portugal neighbourhood.

== History ==
Business merchant Andrew Wheeler Green owned the Grand National Rink at 153 Brock Avenue, south of Dundas Street. Opened in December 1896, the north side of the grounds featured the ice rink and a heated bandstand. Expansion plans began in March 1897 to add new amenities. By May 1900, a new bandstand was constructed and the grounds featured a large fountain surrounded by evergreen trees. A basketball court was added along with a race track for sprinting and distance running and an athletic field for jumping and vaulting. One corner had a summertime outdoor roller skating rink and an open-air hockey rink for the winter.

Skating carnivals were held at the Grand National Rink along with speed skating races that attracted crowds of up to 1,000 spectators. In January 1902, the rink was awarded the bid by the Amateur Skating Association of Canada to hold the Ontario racing championships during the first week of February. Event organizers expected the tournament to attract a wide array of speed skaters from across the country and Green anticipated large attendance numbers. However, its location was too distant from the city’s downtown to draw a big crowd and the gathering became a local sporting event with a provincial name. Green's incurred financial losses forced the closure of the Grand National Rink in 1902.

== Reopenings ==
The grounds of the Grand National Rink remained vacant until the end of 1907, which was then followed by two brief reopenings.

=== Royal Alexandra Rink ===
The north end of the Grand National Rink became the Royal Alexandra Rink, reopened as an outdoor hockey rink in January 1908 at 189 Brock Avenue. Its secretary was Thomas Bert Andrew, a hockey player with the Bank of Toronto Hockey Club in 1904 whose brother, William Herbert Andrew, attended the coronation of King Edward VII and Queen Alexandra in 1902. The last scheduled hockey game at the Royal Alexandra Rink was held in March 1908. By April, the rink and its adjoining property, spanning an area of 3 acres (1.2 ha), became the grounds for a baseball field with a large bleacher-seating area.

=== Brock Avenue Rink ===
Toronto Marlboros treasurer Arthur Hillyard Birmingham and his brother, team captain Herbert Frederick Birmingham, organized a consortium of hockey players to bring the Toronto Professional Hockey Club, a predecessor of the Toronto Maple Leafs, over to the Eastern Canada Hockey Association in response to the hockey club's withdrawal from the Ontario Professional Hockey League on November 19, 1909. The Birmingham brothers telegraphed a proposal to the association on November 24 about their plan to erect a large canvas roof over the site of the former Grand National Rink and install wooden sideboards for a hockey rink by the end of 1909. The cost to build the temporary structure with a seating capacity for 4,000 people was CA$2,000 (equivalent to $53,801 in 2023). Construction of a permanent hockey arena for the professional team was scheduled for the following year on the grounds of the baseball field. The Canadian Hockey Association, which succeeded the Eastern Canada Hockey Association, accepted the proposal on the condition that the new indoor arena had to be ready to house the Toronto club by the next summer.

The former Royal Alexandra Rink became the Brock Avenue Rink, reopened in December 1909 at 189 Brock Avenue. The ice rink featured amateur hockey games, skating carnivals and speed skating races. When the Canadian Hockey Association was dissolved on January 15, 1910, its hockey teams were transferred over to the National Hockey Association and its agreement with the Birmingham brothers came to an end. The last known skating event at the Brock Avenue Rink was held in March 1910 and the Mutual Street Arena in downtown Toronto became the first home arena of the Toronto Hockey Club and, subsequently, the Toronto Maple Leafs.

== McCormick Park ==
The grounds of the former rink and baseball field on Brock Avenue were sold in November 1910 and subdivided into housing lots. Toronto City Council purchased 2.7 acres (1.1 ha) of the land the following month for CA$34,000 (equivalent to $927,600 in 2023) for the purpose of establishing a playground. The parcel of land became the McCormick Playground in 1911, named in recognition of Mary Virginia McCormick, the daughter of American inventor Cyrus Hall McCormick who lived in Toronto in 1908 and donated to the Toronto Playgrounds Association in 1910. The McCormick Recreation Centre opened at the north end of the property in 1912 at 163 Brock Avenue.

By 1963, the outdoor playground became known as McCormick Park. A new McCormick Recreation Centre was opened in 1964 at 66 Sheridan Avenue, located immediately east of the original building which itself became the site for the McCormick Playground Arena in 1972, an indoor skating arena at 179 Brock Avenue.

== List of notable speed skaters ==
Notable athletes who skated at the Grand National Rink include the following:

- Alice Louisa "Louie" Hern, Toronto women's skating champion in 1900 in the mile-long (1.6 km) mixed-pairs competition who married her skating partner in 1902.
- John S. Johnson, American speed skating world record holder in 1895 who competed in the mile-long (1.6 km) race at the rink in 1901.
- John "Johnny" Nilsson, American speed skating world record holder in 1897 and 1900 who competed against Johnson at the rink in 1901.
- William Charles Lawrence "Larry" Piper, Canadian skating champion in 1901 in the 220-yard (200 m) hurdles who later became a professional baseball player in the minor leagues in 1908.
- Frederick "Fred" James Robson, Canadian skating champion in the 220-yard (200 m) straightaways in 1900 and 1901 who later won speed skating world records in 1904 and 1911.
- Lot Roe, Ontario skating champion in the two-mile (3.2 km) and five-mile (8 km) races at the rink in 1902 who later won a speed skating world record in 1910.
- Lewis "Lou" Leslie Walker, Toronto men's skating champion in 1900 in the mile-long (1.6 km) mixed-pairs competition with Hern who then married her in 1902.
