= Kildare–McCormick House =

Historic house in Alabama, United States

- U.S. National Register of Historic Places
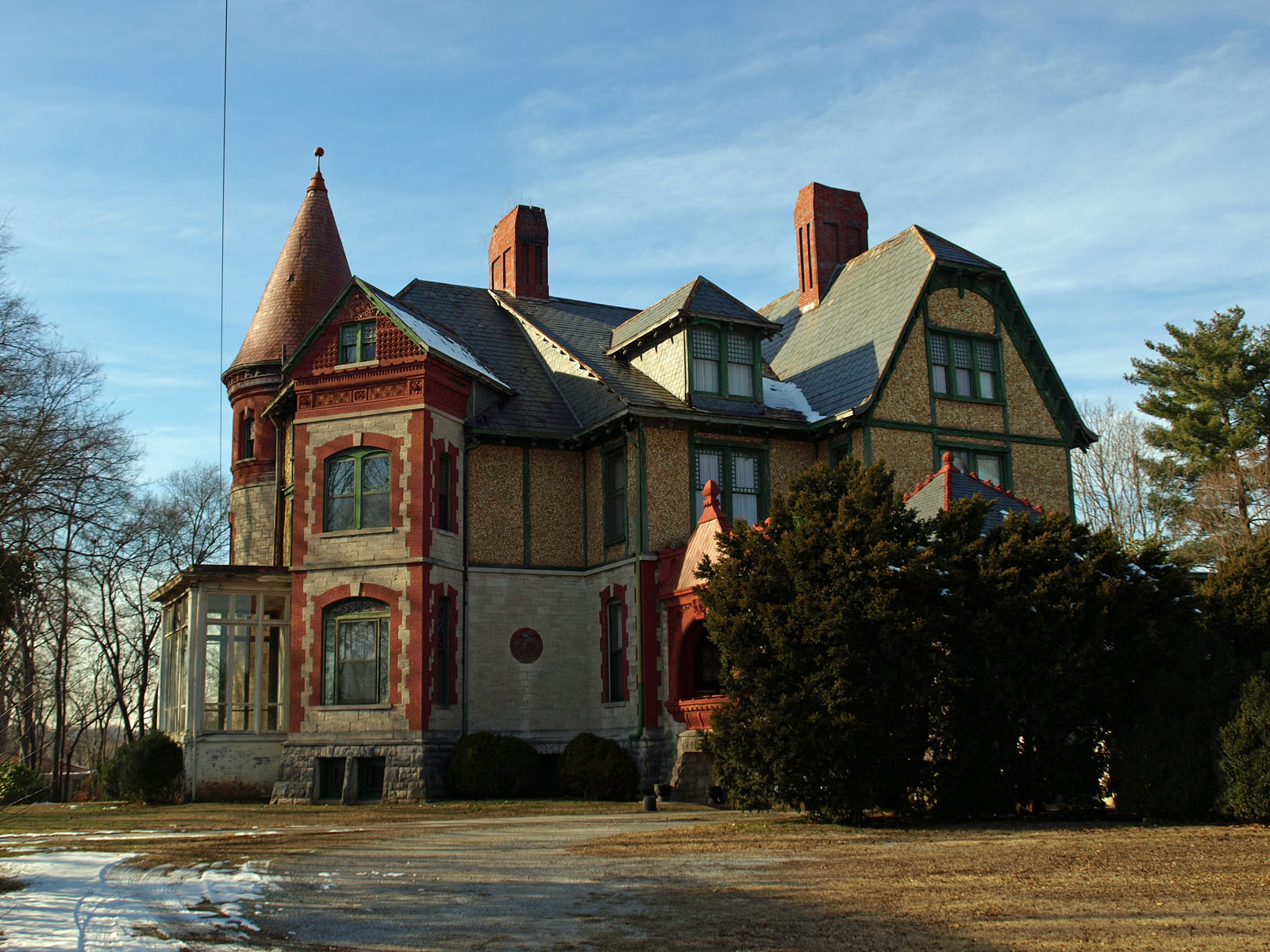
- The house in December 2010

- Location within Huntsville, Alabama Location within Alabama Location within the United States
- Location: 2005 Kildare St., Huntsville, Alabama
- Coordinates: 34°44′59″N 86°35′6″W
- Area: 1.1 acres (0.45 ha)
- Built: 1886–87
- Architectural style: Queen Anne
- NRHP reference No.: 82002051
- Added to NRHP: July 15, 1982

The Kildare–McCormick House is a historic residence in Huntsville, Alabama. The highly ornate, Queen Anne-style mansion was built in 1886–87. Its early owners contributed to the development of Huntsville, both through industrial projects and philanthropic efforts. The house was listed on the National Register of Historic Places in 1982.

== History ==
The house was built by industrialist Michael O'Shaugnessey, who had come to Huntsville from Nashville in 1881 with his brother to open a cottonseed oil factory. He also was a member of the North Alabama Improvement Company, which invested in infrastructure and industry and were the main backers of Dallas Mill. O'Shaugnessey built his mansion in 1886 on 71 acres (29 ha), naming it Kildare, after the county in Ireland where he was born.

O'Shaugnessey returned to Nashville in 1900, and sold the house to Mary Virginia McCormick, daughter of Cyrus McCormick, another industrial magnate who invented the mechanical reaper. Virginia McCormick lived in the house as a winter residence with her caretaker Grace Walker. McCormick and Walker were heavily involved in philanthropic efforts in the city. McCormick funded several YMCAs in the mill villages surrounding town, an African-American wing for the then-segregated Huntsville Hospital, and a hospital at Alabama A&M University; Virginia's relative, Robert R. McCormick also funded A&M's Domestic Science Building. The house was used for many social events, including Christmas parties for children, Easter egg hunts, and a celebration for Virginia's birthday in May. During McCormick's tenure, a conservatory was added to the side of the ballroom and a porch added to the rear of the house.

McCormick moved out of the house in 1931, and the family subdivided and sold the property the next year. Over the next 40 years, the house had no fewer than 10 owners who repurposed the house as a hotel, boarding house, health spa, antique shop, and brothel. After years of neglect, the house was purchased in 1975 by James Reeves, who restored the house over the next 20 years. The current owners purchased the house in 2007 and constructed a protective barrier around it sometime after 2013. As of 2024, the structure had fallen into disrepair, with broken windows and mature foliage growing from the eastern chimney.

== Architecture ==
The Kildare–McCormick House is three stories, plus an English basement, and contains 40 rooms and ove 10,000 square feet (1580 sq. m.) of living space. The house has a central block with a southern wing with a rectangular ell on one corner and a cylindrical tower on the other, and a northwestern wing with an semicircular section. Designed in a highly decorated Queen Anne style, the exterior combines a variety of materials and colors.

The basement and first floor, as well as second floor on the southeast bay and tower, are covered in limestone block, the first floor more smooth than the basement. Red brick is used for quoins and window surrounds on the southeast bay, and for the third floor of the tower. The gable end of the southeast bay contains a small window and an intricate terra cotta relief. The upper floors are faced with tan river stones, divided into panels with green-painted wood. Windows on the first floor are mostly one-over-one sashes, some with sidelights and stained glass or leaded glass transoms. On the main block of the second floor, windows are one-over-one sashes with the upper pane surrounded by a row of small panes. Third floor windows have the entire upper sash composed of small panes. The irregular-shaped slate roof is punctuated by numerous gables and dormers, as well as four brick chimneys with recessed panels in each side and tapered tops. Wooden brackets project from the eaves. A flat roofed porch extends across the front of the house, the northern portion of which is supported by wooden posts and a short rail. The portion over the main entrance has a limestone wall on the south end with a terra cotta-framed arched opening with an ornamental hipped roof and finial. A pyramidal roofed porte-cochère with terra cotta ridges and a finial extends from the porch over the semicircular driveway.

The main entrance opens into a hall with a stairway, doors to two parlors to the right, the dining room at the rear, and the ballroom to the south. The ballroom contains the southeastern bay and tower, and opens into the conservatory, added in the early 20th century. A porch and breakfast room are behind the dining room. The northwestern wing contains the butler's pantry, stairs to the kitchen in the basement, a bathroom, and the library. The second floor contains a large hall and seven bedrooms. The third floor, which is reached by a separate flight of stairs from the second floor hall, contains four further bedrooms and a billiard room.
