= Alice Bennett =

American physician

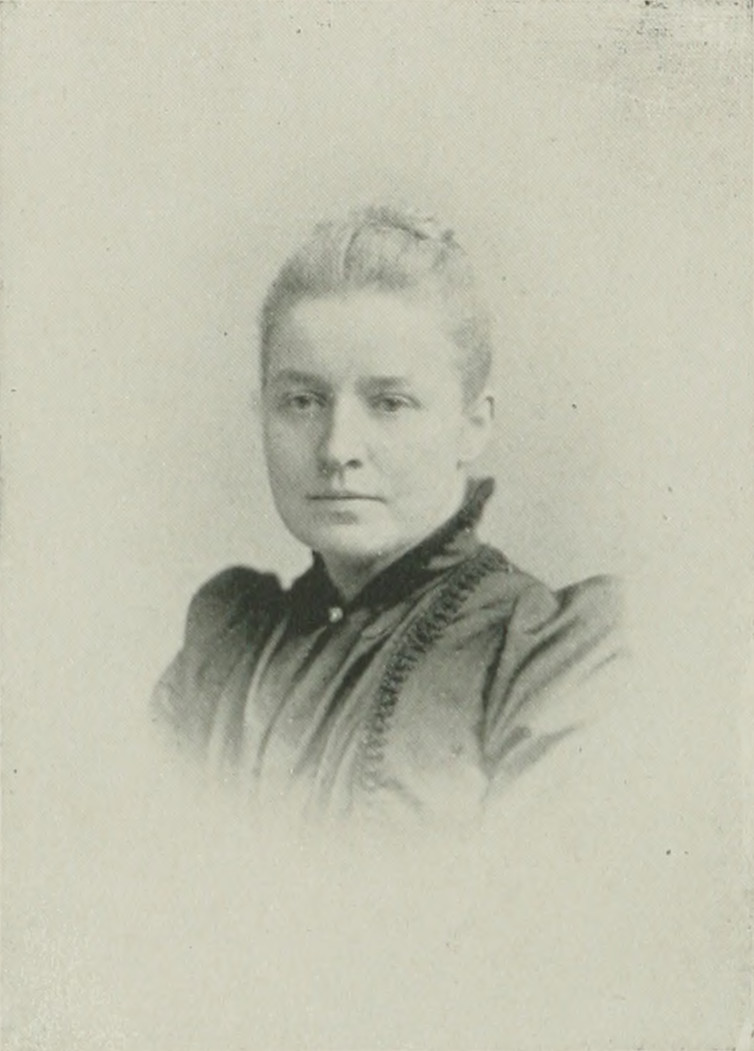
Portrait photo from A Woman of the Century

(Mary) Alice Bennett (January 31, 1851 – 1925) was a US physician and the first woman to obtain a Ph.D. from the University of Pennsylvania. Before she obtained her Ph.D., she attended the Woman's Medical College of Pennsylvania. In addition, Bennett was the first female superintendent in the women's section at the state hospital for the insane in Norristown, Pennsylvania, and the first woman president of the Montgomery Country Medical Society. With other clinicians, she was a co-founder of the National Conference of Charities and Correction.

== Early life and education ==
Bennett spent her first years in her hometown of Wrentham, Massachusetts with her parents, Lydia Hayden and Isaac Francis Bennett and her five older siblings. After her graduation, Bennett taught for four years in local school districts around Wrentham. In 1872, she attended the Woman's Medical College of Pennsylvania in Philadelphia. Once obtaining her MD in 1876, Bennett worked in a dispensary in the Philadelphia slums. After leaving her work she was appointed as demonstrator of anatomy in the Woman's Medical College of Pennsylvania. She continued her studies and in 1880 became the first woman to obtain a Ph.D. from the University of Pennsylvania. As she finished up her Ph.D., Hiram Corson assisted in her appointment to medical superintendent of the Department for Women at the Pennsylvania State Hospital for the Insane at Norristown.

== Work and accomplishments ==
Alice Bennett was elected as the first female president of the Montgomery County Medical Society in Pennsylvania. During her lifetime she was a member of many societies including the American Medical Association, the Philadelphia Neurological Society and the Medical Jurisprudence Society, as well as one of the contributors to the Spring Garden Unitarian Church of Philadelphia.

Bennett worked as the medical superintendent of the Department for Women at the Pennsylvania State Hospital for the Insane at Norristown from 1880 to 1896. During her time there, she became an advocate for the humane treatment of patients. She condemned the use of restraints on mental and insane patients, arguing that they were ineffective and resulted in anger. Bennett eliminated these practices in her own institution, resulting in other institutions doing the same. As a replacement, the innovative doctor introduced occupational therapy such as, handicrafts, music and art. Her research articles and papers on the nature and characteristics of mental illness won her professional recognition in her field.

Over the course of her career, Bennett gained recognition for treating patients humanely without the use of physical restraints, and for interpreting women's health mental health in court. By testifying in the 1888 murder trial of Sarah Whiteling, she became one of the first female doctors to apply psychiatric expertise to a legal case.

Bennett left the state hospital in 1896, moving back to her hometown of Wrentham and maintaining a private practice. In 1910 she discovered Emily Blackwell's New York Infirmary for Indigent Women and Children. She volunteered at the infirmary as the head of the outpatient department of obstetrics for fifteen years. The University of Pennsylvania created the Mary Alice Bennett Professorship in honor of Alice Bennett in 2005.

== Death ==
Bennett was never married. She died of angina pectoris at the New York infirmary in 1925 and was buried in Wrentham, Massachusetts.
