= National Conference of Charities and Correction =

National Conference of Charities and Correction (NCCC) was an American organization focused on social welfare. It was established in 1874 as the Conference of Boards of Public Charities. During the period of 1875 through 1879, it held the name Conference of Charities. In 1880 and the following year, it used the name Conference of Charities and Correction. In 1882 through 1916, the name was National Conference of Charities and Correction. From 1917 through 1955, it was called National Conference of Social Work. The most current name change, which occurred in 1956, was to National Conference on Social Welfare.

Proceedings of the National Conference of Charities and Correction (1888)

== Conference of State Boards of Charities (1872) ==
In February 1872, the State Commissioners of Public Charities of Illinois came to Madison, Wisconsin and accompanied by the State Board of Charities and Reform of Wisconsin, visited the Wisconsin Hospital for the Insane and the Soldiers' Orphans' Home at this place; the House of Correction in Milwaukee; the Wisconsin Industrial School for Boys at Waukesha; the Institution for the Education of the Blind at Janesville, and for the Deaf at Delavan. During that trip, it was talked generally that it would be a good thing for the boards of the states of Michigan, Missouri, Illinois, and Wisconsin to meet together, become better acquainted with each other, exchange views on subjects in which all were interested, and try and obtain such information as would the better enable them to do their work in a proper manner; and it was agreed that the secretary of the Illinois state board should, when it was deemed a suitable time, notify each member of each of said state boards to meet and confer together at Chicago.

This meeting was held at the Sherman House on May 14 and 15, 1872, and was represented by two delegates from Michigan, four from Illinois and five from Wisconsin. William C. Allen, of Wisconsin, presided, and Charles M. Crosswell, of Michigan, acted as secretary. A committee was appointed to report a program of subjects for the consideration of the conference. The following was unanimously adopted:

1. The object of imprisonment. (1) The protection of society; (2) The reformation of the criminal; (3) The prevention of crime.
2. The result of the examination of jails in these three states How far is the object sought attained under the present system.
3. What would be the effect of a substitution of compulsory labor for compulsory idleness?
4. Is compulsory labor in county jails practicable?
5. Intermediate prisons. (1) The economic question; comparative cost of construction; comparative cost of inaintenance. (2) Their reformatory effect. (3) Their deterrent effect.
6. Obstacles to be overcome.
7. Is it desirable to make an immediate effort to secure their establishment.
8. Points with regard to which more detailed and accurate information is needed.
9. Details of plan.

The several subjects presented for consideration were then discussed, all the members taking part, and after deliberation, a committee was appointed to document the views of the conference upon the subjects considered and discussed. That committee subsequently made a report, which was unanimously adopted. This was the beginning of the National Conference of Charities.

The next conference of charities was held on April 15 and 16, 1873, at the Plankinton House, Milwaukee. Illinois, Michigan, and Wisconsin were represented. At this meeting, questions of similar character to those named in the first conference were discussed. After a visit to several local institutions, this ended the second and last Conference of State Boards of Charities, as such.

== First National Conference of Charities (1874) ==
These conferences attracted so much attention that the American Social Science Association in its call for a meeting to be held in New York City on May 19, 1874, invited the State Boards of Charities in the several states to send delegates, and hold a conference in connection with it. In response, this meeting was known as the First National Conference of Charities. Topics similar to those discussed at the conferences at Chicago and Milwaukee were brought before the meeting, which met as a distinct body on the second day of that of the Social Science Association. At this session, a committee was appointed to report a plan for the uniformity of statistics of pauperism and crime, and for a better co-operation among the boards of charities of the U.S. At the second session, held the same day, the Boards of Health met jointly with them. Thereafter, the National Conference of Charities, as such, did not make much show in the reports, and its proceedings as a distinct organization were not published. At no time during the sessions were there as many present, or as much interest manifested, as at either the meetings at Chicago or Milwaukee; but a committee was appointed, and it made a report thereafter, the concluding part of which as follows:—

"It is hoped that the boards of public charity, and such others as may from time to time be established in the other states, will find it convenient, as it certainly would seem to be useful, to maintain a constant correspondence with each other, and to meet together for conference at least once a year.

== Second National Conference of Charities (1875) ==
The Second National Conference was held at Detroit, May 12 and 13, 1875. The Social Science Association met at the same time and place. Some of the members in attendance, and notably the Wisconsin delegation insisted on severing the quasi-connection with the Social Science Association, urging that the practical questions regarding the poor, the insane and criminal classes, were of sufficient importance to absorb all the time at the Conference of Charities; that many of the questions discussed at the meetings of social science were very interesting to listen to, some of them really valuable, but did not meet the demands of the present-day with the Conference of Charities; some of the attendees of the Conference of Charities wanted to attend the Social Science Association meetings, which they could not do when they met at the same time as the Conference of Charities, and demanded that the Conference of Charities next conference should be held at a different time and place from the Social Science Association. A majority, however, decided to still meet together, and the next conference was called at Saratoga, September 5, 1876. One concession was made to the demand of the State Boards of Charities, and the proceedings of the conference for the first time had a separate publication. The Wisconsin delegation left Detroit pleased with the city and their treatment there, and gratified with the attendance of delegates to the conference. They went there seeking information, expecting to find able teachers on the question of how to provide best for the chronic insane. Theory was abundant. They departed disappointed.

== Third National Conference of Charities (1876) ==
The Third Conference of Charities was held at Saratoga Springs, New York, 5–7 September 1876 and was in session three days.

== Fourth National Conference of Charities (1877) ==
The Fourth Conference of Charities was held at Saratoga, September 5 and 6, 1877. The Social Science Association was placed in the foreground, and the delegation from Wisconsin gave notice to the conference that this would be their last appearance in the role of assisting to make a side show for the big performance. A resolution was adopted that the next conference should be held at Chicago, which resolution was subsequently reconsidered, and the secretaries authorized to fix the time and place, and make the call for the next conference.

== Fifth National Conference of Charities (1878) ==
The fifth annual meeting of the National Conference of Charities was held at Cincinnati, May 21–23, 1878. This conference was again called in connection with the Social Science Association, was the only one in which the state of Wisconsin had no representation, and the last held in connection with any other organization.

== Sixth National Conference of Charities (1879) ==
The Sixth Conference was held in Chicago, June 10–12, 1879. In the published proceedings of this conference the names of the delegates in attendance make their appearance for the first time. It had been predicted that owing to the cutting loose from the Social Science Association, the meeting would be small in numbers; but on the contrary, it was larger. An advocate of the joint meetings, writing the history of this conference, wrote:—

"The Chicago conference was the most important of these gatherings that have been held. Not only were the various State Boards of Charities represented, but a number of states having no such boards were represented by delegates appointed by their respective governors. Valuable papers were read, and the subjects of insanity, pauperism and crime were discussed with reference to the application of preventive measures."

== Seventh National Conference of Charities (1880) ==
The Seventh Conference was held at Cleveland, June 29 to July 1, 1880. This conference was a very important one, both as regards numbers and work.

== Eighth National Conference of Charities (1881) ==
The Eighth Conference was held in Boston, July 25–30, 1881. The committee on organization recommended that the president of the next conference should commence his duties at the close of the present year's sessions, which was adopted.

== Ninth National Conference of Charities (1883) ==
In 1883, at the ninth annual convening of the organization, the NCCC president gave a history of the organization to date, stating that at the time, no book of record had ever been kept of the proceedings of the conferences, no by-laws adopted, and the rules governing deliberations were made at each session.

== Officers ==
- Homer Folks, secretary, 1901
- Hiram Giles, president
- William Pryor Letchworth, president, 1884
- Julian Mack, president
- Charles Franklin Robertson, vice-president
- Lillian M. N. Stevens, corresponding secretary; also served on the standing committee on the Co-operation of Women in the Management of Charitable Reformatory and Penal Institutions
- Graham Taylor, president, 1914
- Gertrude Vaile, executive secretary, 1916

== Notable people ==
- Isabel Barrows, stenographer and editor for numerous years
- Alice Bennett, NCCC co-founder
- Libbie Beach Brown, Nebraska delegate, 1891 and 1892
- Indiana Sopris Cushman, served on the History of Child-Saving Work Committee, 1893.
- Mary Dewson, presented her paper, "The Delinquent Girl on Parole", 1911
- Abraham Flexner, presented "Is Social Work a Profession?", 1915
- Joseph Krauskopf, Missouri life-member of the board
- Zilpha Drew Smith, speaker, 1884 and 1892
- Lilian Carpenter Streeter, presented "The Relation of Mental Defect to the Neglected, Dependent, and Delinquent Children of New Hampshire", 1915; first woman to give a paper of this kind at a national conference
