= Haverford State Hospital =

Hospital in Pennsylvania, United States

Coordinates: 39.995°N 75.341°W

The Haverford State Hospital was a psychiatric hospital outside of Philadelphia. Its extensive former grounds occupy the northern sections of Delaware County west of the city of Philadelphia, in Haverford Township.

A residential development, Haverford Reserve, now occupies the former site of the asylum.

== History ==
The hospital was constructed in 1964 as a state-of-the-art hospital. Patients were able to use a bowling alley, private rooms, recreational activities, and were given jobs within the hospital, with some being able to leave regularly. The complex consisted of 23 buildings, the largest being the Acute Intensive Care Center, named Hilltop (building 4). The facility also contained a boiler plant, garage, warehouse, administration building, recreation building, five extended treatment wards, two geriatric wards, and two kitchen buildings.

Victory Gyory was discharged through a writ of Habeas corpus on September 3, 1969.

At the time of its closure in 1998, its superintendent was Aidan Altenor. Its closure was partly due to a lawsuit based on the Americans with Disabilities Act of 1990, as well as the general deinstitutionalization of the state hospital system. When it closed, most of the patients were transferred to the Norristown State Hospital. The land was used for some years as a haunted hayride, though this use had ceased in the years leading up to its demolition and redevelopment.

=== Sales scandal ===
On November 14, 2006, the Haverford Township Board of Commissioners approved the Agreement of Sale and Preliminary Land Development Plans. The so-called Haverford Reserve development was to include 100 carriage homes and 198 condominiums, as well as several athletic fields and over 120 areas for passive recreation. The hospital had also been a target in the previous year for people scrapping for copper and other valuable metals. On April 5, 2007, the Pennsylvania Attorney General filed an indictment against Haverford Township 4th ward commissioner Fred C. Moran in conjunction with the sale of the state hospital property, alleging that Moran had disclosed the confidential bids of other potential developers to one of the contractors and offered preferential zoning decisions in exchange for an additional $500,000 bid for the Township. Moran was convicted of Bribery in Official and Political Matters in 2008, and lost his appeal.

=== Development ===
Demolition of the hospital began in early June 2007, beginning with the administration and recreation buildings, followed by the extended treatment and geriatric wards. The final two buildings to be demolished were the boiler plant, and the five story Hilltop building, which was demolished on January 17, 2008.

The upper portion of the property was developed into housing, while the lower portion was developed into athletic and recreation areas for the township. The woods surrounding the property to the south and west have been preserved. The Reserve includes over five miles of hiking trails, a playground, a dog park, two grass fields, one synthetic turf field, one synthetic turf baseball and softball diamond, and a community recreation and environmental center.
