= Norristown State Hospital =

Coordinates: 40.1321°N 75.3481°W

- Pennsylvania Department of Human Services
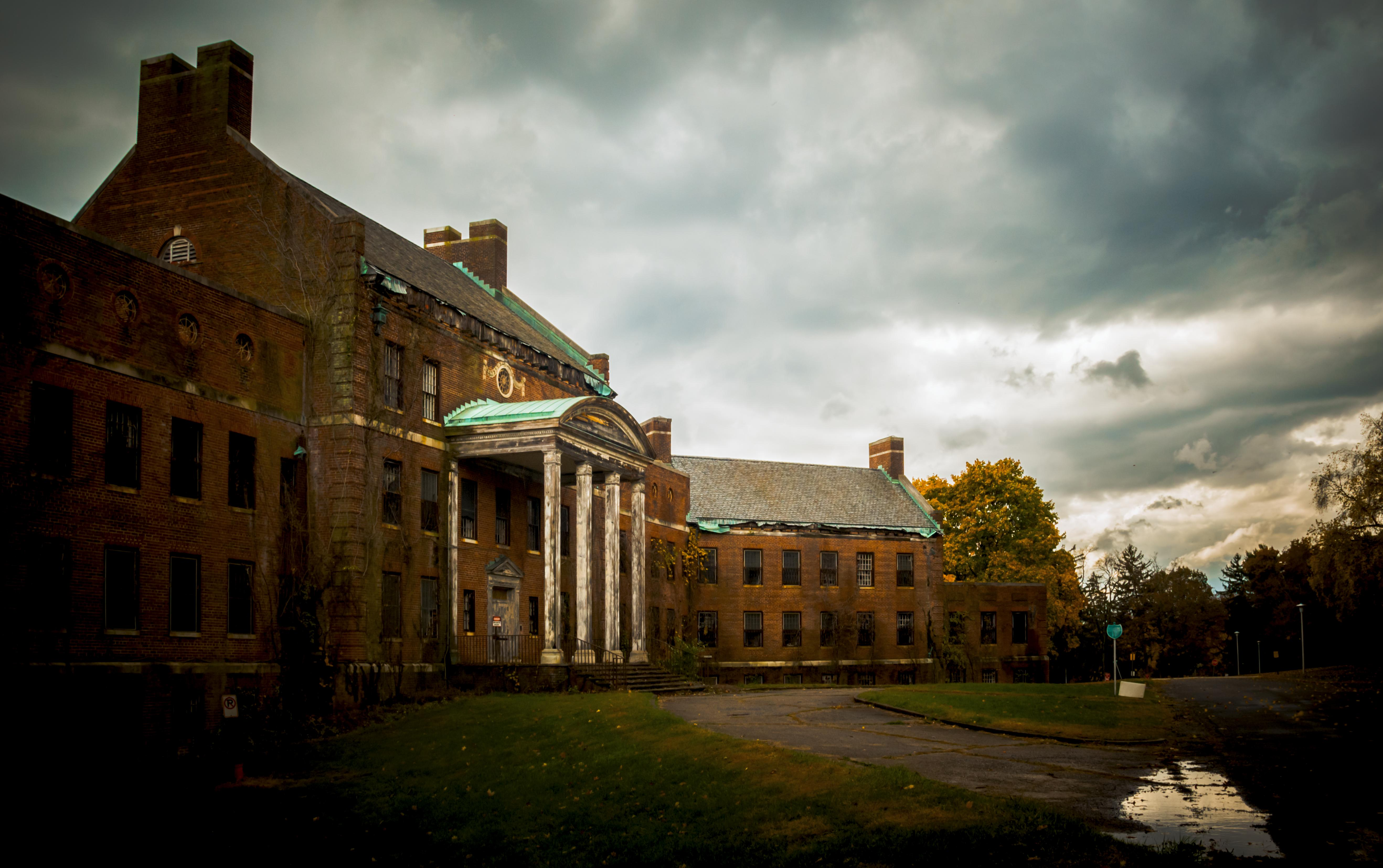
- Norristown State Hospital, October 2015

Geography
- Location: Norristown, Pennsylvania, United States

Organization
- Care system: Publicly Funded State Hospital
- Type: Behaviour therapy

History
- Founded: May 5, 1876
- Closed: Civil section closed January 2019

Links
- Website: Norristown State Hospital PA DHS
- Lists: Hospitals in Pennsylvania

Norristown State Hospital, originally known as the State Lunatic Hospital at Norristown, is an active state-funded psychiatric hospital located outside the city of Philadelphia in suburban Norristown, Pennsylvania. It was originally designed between 1878 and 1880, by the local firm of Wilson Brothers & Company; of which, the original structure was set in a red brick Victorian High Gothic motif. It remains active for its originally clinical intention, and currently serving Bucks County, Chester County, Delaware County, Montgomery County and Philadelphia County, providing clinical services in General Psychiatry and Forensic Psychiatry. Additionally, there are various agencies that sublet state hospital buildings for a variety of psychiatric, residential and social services. These agencies currently make up the majority of services that are offered on the grounds of the hospital.

In February 2018, the Commonwealth of Pennsylvania announced that they would be closing the civil unit at Norristown State permanently. There have been some voices of dissent among the public, as the majority of these patients would be redirected to community residential settings and outpatient psychiatry. This closure will re-route remaining civil psychiatric beds north to Danville State Hospital in Montour County, Pennsylvania. The forensic facilities at Norristown, however, will remain active well into the foreseeable future, as it is one of only two such facilities in Pennsylvania.

== History ==
=== Opening and Zenith ===
The Pennsylvania Legislature passed a law in 1876 calling for a state mental hospital to be established in the southeastern part of the state. Previously, psychiatric patients had to be sent at a distant to Harrisburg State Hospital, which could accommodate their various needs. However, overcrowding and increasing need from various Pennsylvania counties at this facility made the need for a regional hospital for the insane fundamental.

Ground was broken at the site on March 12, 1878, after which, John Rice was appropriated a contract of $600,000 from the state legislature to construct seven separate wards, as well as the administration building (Building #19). This was done to accommodate the overcrowding which was taking place in the insane wards of the Philadelphia Almshouse, as well as to supply a regional asylum to relieve pressure placed upon Harrisburg State Hospital. The construction for the original hospital complex was completed on February 17, 1879. Situated on two hundred and sixty-five acres, the original design of the hospital was similar to the Kirkbride plan with echelons on both sides of the central administration building with two-story ward-buildings with two wards on each floor connected by covered passageways. The kitchen, laundry, chapel, and boiler house et cetera sat directly behind administration. This architectural design allowed different wards based upon the sex and level of functioning of the patients.

From the main gate, a gradual rise in terrain brings the visitor to the entrance of the administration building as he is greeted with a tiled floor, ornamental brick wainscot, growing plants bringing verdure into winter and an electrically arranged clock – all showing a modern taste in architecture.

Roads and sewers were built and a large portion of the grounds were enclosed by an iron fence eight feet high. Barns and a root-house were also constructed. The sewage was emptied into Stony Creek until it was found to be injurious.

Under the supervision of Chief Physicians Dr. Robert H. Chase and Dr. Alice Bennett, the hospital began receiving patients on July 12, 1880.

=== Overcrowding and Institutionalization ===
By 1937, the population of the state hospital had risen to 3,077, having come down from 3,394 the year before, but still well above the inpatient capacity for the campus. The following year the Commonwealth of Pennsylvania allocated funds for the construction of several new structures to reduce the strain the hospitals staff and open up new beds for the growing demands of the population.

New treatment modalities were added to the state hospital at this time. Most notably the use of craft and occupational therapy was skillfully employed by the staff to add in the treatment of various anxiety related conditions. Small hand-crafted items such as: wicker baskets, rugs, leather products, and fiber mats all sold locally for the benefit of the hospital.

In 1998, Haverford State Hospital was closed and the inpatient population was transferred to Norristown in an attempt to consolidate the resources of the Department of Human Services.

== Clinical innovations ==
=== First female chief physician ===
Norristown State Hospital piloted a different type of administrative hierarchy for hospitals, wherein female patients would be treated exclusively by a female physician. To run this new medical department, they appointed Dr. Alice Bennett to govern over the medical and psychiatric affairs of the new hospital. Dr. Bennett obtained her MD in 1876 from the Women's Medical College of Pennsylvania, where she was later an anatomy instructor until accepting this post at Norristown. She was also awarded a PhD from the University of Pennsylvania in 1880, the first woman in any discipline to achieve this honor. Dr. Bennett was also noted for being politically tied to Susan B. Anthony, whom she corresponded with, and to the early Women's Suffrage movement. Prior to her appointment as Chief Physician, and the completion of her medical education, Dr. Bennett had joined with other clinicians to help found the National Conference of Charities and Correction in 1874.

During her tenure at the state hospital, she championed several reforms to clinical practice. Paramount to these reforms was the removal of physical and mechanical restraints, which had previously been employed to detain patients. For the year 1895, Dr. Bennett reported that no restraints had been employed by hospital orderlies and no suicides had been committed by the inpatient population. As a matter of therapeutic modality, Dr. Bennett offered a variety of treatments for addressing the ailments of her patients, including: diet, bathing, topical blood letting, stimulants (alcohol), digitalis, opium, chloral, ergot, tonics, and potassium bromide.

Dr. Bennett briefly gained notoriety through her clinical research into various illnesses, most notably Bright's disease (now known as chronic Nephritis). would later resign from the hospital in 1896 over an ethical controversy that surrounded her following her assertion that insanity could be cured through an ovariectomy (removal of the ovaries). Following this professional issue, she did not practice medicine again until 1910.

=== Modern Clinical Psychiatry ===
The future superintendent Arthur Percy Noyes published the first edition of his sentinel medical text 'Modern Clinical Psychiatry' in the spring of 1936, outlining the common practice of psychiatric interviews and the collection of relevant psycho-historical data. Dr. Noyes specifically prepared this book for training medical students, who were then prolific on the grounds on the state hospital. But the book is far more important than the preface would imply, and had a profound influence on the practice and conceptualization of the practice of psychiatry. It is well annotated and gives to the student ample material regarding the evolution of modern medical concepts. It remains a classic and has been used in medical schools internationally well after the passing of Dr. Noyes in 1963. The scientific principles which Dr. Noyes incorporated into his work are carried over through the Arthur Noyes Forensic Center (Building #51), the Arthur P. Noyes Schizophrenia Conference and the Arthur P. Noyes Research Foundation. To this day Dr. Noyes' portrait remains hung in the administration building in the hospital as a homage.

=== Creation of Outpatient Clinics ===
While he was president of the American Psychiatric Association, Dr. Noyes also discussed the prospect of altering the nature of social services, focusing on the possibility of community-based psychiatric care. He had previously been vocal about the need for internal reform to the state hospital system, looking to divert patients to lower levels of care to reduce the strain on the commonwealth's limited resources.

== Modern hospital and closure ==
Across from a neighborhood of bungalows and rowhouses along the Norristown-West Norriton border, Norristown State Hospital currently occupies 225 acres, and has roughly thirty surviving buildings in varying conditions. Some of the buildings have recently been rented to social-service providers and local government agencies, while others remain vacant due to their state of decay. Famously the 'Female Admission Building' located at the front entrance to the hospital remains derelict, and is occasionally set on fire as practice for the Norristown Fire Department. Total closure of the full facility seems unlikely as the one hundred and thirty-six patient forensic unit for criminally committed patients, located in Building #51, is often near capacity. There is a precedent for turning obsolete parts of Norristown State Hospital into an asset for the neighborhoods surrounding it, such as the neighboring Norristown Farm Park, an immense public park on land where patients once raised crops and livestock. However, the fate of the hospital campus itself remains controversial and has been the source of considerable public debate in recent months.

=== Closure of the Civil Section ===
The Department of Human Services announced that Norristown State Hospital's civil section is slated to close in January 2019. However, the fate of the remaining forensic portion of the hospital remains contested, as forensic inpatient beds remain relatively rare. Currently, Norristown is one of only two state sites that offer forensic psychiatric care, the other being Torrance State Hospital. Various community advocacy groups have protested the closure of this hospital, citing that behavioral healthcare services are already underfunded and that many patients are unable to survive outside of the structure of an institutional setting. there have been talks of relocating the forensic beds currently at Norristown to another site before 2022, however this remains ambiguous, as no site has been selected to date. Local groups have since voiced their concerns that the Commonwealth of Pennsylvania is sacrificing patient welfare for a slight financial advantage in the state budget. This closure also comes following a change in the paradigm of psychiatric care, where the clinical utility of long-term care facilities, such as state hospitals, appear to be gaining favor with behavioral health professionals.

=== Subletted buildings to other tenants ===
In an effort to utilize some of the structures currently on the grounds of the hospital, the Commonwealth of Pennsylvania has granted leases to several social service agencies for the use of derelict buildings. Currently, Resources for Human Development run the CHOC program on the grounds, which is a long-term homeless shelter for the various residents of Montgomery County. Carelink- STAR also maintains an operation for the care of sex offenders who also have been diagnosed with an intellectual disability. Horizon House has maintained a residential facility on-site, but its current status is unknown. Circle Lodge is another agency with occupies a state building, which is utilizes to provide a structured residence/traditional housing to the mentally ill. Finally, a short-term forensic psychiatric unit is maintained through Montgomery County Emergency Services, which does fulfill part of the former state hospital capacity for psychiatric beds. All of these buildings are leased from the state for a fee of $1 per year. These tenants are currently being assisted by the commonwealth to relocate their services off of the grounds by January 2020, as the redevelopment of the hospital campus is being given serious consideration by the city of Norristown and by the Department of Human Services. Development firms hope to re-purpose the grounds for commercial purposes by 2022 with the removal of all remaining clinical services.

=== Norristown State Hospital Historical Society ===
In the wake of the announced closure of Norristown State Hospital, there has been growing concern about the fate of the property and the legacy of the facility. While there have been no moves by the state to alter its ownership of the land, the social service administration has been quiet to a definitive long-term plan. Consequently, some local citizens have begun the process of collecting photos, memoirs and documentation of the hospital to preserve its benefaction to the city of Norristown. This process is currently in its infancy, and there has been little involvement from the state, whose archives remain closed. The efforts of this group largely come from private efforts and through the advocacy of groups such as Asylum Projects. There is no explicit attempt to delay or stop the closure of the civil unit, nor is there any effort to preserve the tattered remnants of the original 1880 hospital complex. However, they do currently maintain an archive of documents relating to the history of the institution that is accessible to the public.

== Hospital Superintendents ==
Norristown State Hospital was originally designed to be divided into two separate facilities, each with a matching wing of the institution. These facilities were under the care of male and female physicians respectively. However, while these two departments shared common pathology and medical staff, they did not have a single administration. This remained to be the case with Norristown State Hospital until 1923, when the Commonwealth of Pennsylvania reversed this decision, integrating the wards for both men and women. The hospital itself and all patients wards remained coed with the exception of the forensic unit (Building #51), which did not integrate male and female patients until 1987 when these services were merged.

- Dr. Robert H. Chase, MD- (Male Dept.) 1880–1893
- Dr. Mary Alice Bennett, PhD MD- (Female Dept.) 1880–1896
- Dr. David Dorrington Richardson, MD- (Male Dept.) 1893–1905
- Dr. Susan J. Tabor, MD- (Female Dept.) 1896–1900
- Dr. Mary Moore Wolfe, MD- (Female Dept.) 1900–1909
- Dr. William M. Richardson, MD- (Male Dept.) 1905–1915
- Dr. Jessie M. Petersen, MD- (Female Dept.) 1909–1921
- Dr. S. Metz Miller, PhG MD- (Male Dept.) 1915–1921
- Dr. E.G. Heyer, MD- Superintendent 1921(?)
- Dr. Annie R. Elliott, MD- Superintendent ?-1936
- Dr. Arthur Percy Noyes, MD- Superintendent 1936–1959
- Dr. Nolan D. Lewis, MD- Superintendent 1959–1963
- Dr. Carmela deRivas, MD- Superintendent 1963–1970
- Dr. Albert R. DiDario, MD- Superintendent, ?-1997
- Dr. Aiden Altenor, PhD- Superintendent, 1997-2001
- Gerry Kent, MSN- Chief Operating Officer, 2001-2012
- Edna I. McCutcheon, MSW- Chief Operating Officer, 2012–present

== In popular culture ==
The film Silver Linings Playbook was partially shot at Norristown State Hospital. Several scenes of the alleged psychiatric facility in Baltimore were in fact defunct state hospital buildings that had recently been retired from clinical use. The old 19th-century, brick Refactory building is clearly visible in several scenes. Also, a fake security gatehouse for the film was set up at Gate #4 near Sterigere Street for about two weeks, much to the annoyance of hospital employees, who were blocked from using this entrance. However, this scene did not make it into the final cut of the film.

The 19th-century serial killer Dr. H. H. Holmes was briefly employed at the hospital as a druggist, but quit after being on-site for only a handful of days.

The hospital is featured in the 2014 biopic film Foxcatcher about the life of American millionaire John du Pont.

Portrait of Lillian Hammit (Girl in a Big Hat) (c. 1888) was of a woman who fantasized about marrying the painter, Thomas Eakins. She was committed to Norristown Asylum in 1892.

President George Washington briefly resided on the grounds of the future site of the state hospital in 1778 while on campaign against the British Army.

=== Notable staff ===
- Francis Xavier Dercum- American physician who first described the disease Adiposis dolorosa
- Charles Sophy- Medical Director for the County of Los Angeles Department of Children and Family Services
- Samuel K. McConnell Jr.- Republican member of the U.S. House of Representatives from Pennsylvania
- Anna Sarah Kugler- first medical missionary of the Evangelical Lutheran General Synod of the United States of North America
- John E. Fryer- American psychiatrist and gay rights activist
- Alice Bennett- first woman to receive a PhD from the University of Pennsylvania
- Arthur Percy Noyes- Author of Modern Clinical Psychiatry and president of the American Psychiatric Association

=== Notable patients ===
- Sylvia Seegrist- who opened fire on a Pennsylvania shopping mall. She killed three people and wounded seven others before finally being disarmed. She was twenty-five years old at the time, and had been diagnosed as suffering from Paranoid Schizophrenia ten years prior. Having been committed and discharged from psychiatric care several times, her case stimulated discussion about the state's legal authority to commit at-risk people into mental care facilities versus the need for individual rights.
- John du Pont- an American philanthropist, heir to the Du Pont family fortune, and a convicted murderer.
- Alice Logan- daughter of American playwright Cornelius Ambrosius Logan
- Richard Greist- killed his wife and unborn son in 1978, mutilating both bodies, and has remained a patient committed to the grounds for the past four decades.

== Timeline: 1876–present ==
- 1876 – The Pennsylvania Legislature passed a law calling for a state mental hospital to be established in the southeastern part of the state.
- 1878 – Ground was broken for construction of the hospital.
- 1879 – Construction completed.
- 1880 – The first female patient was admitted.
- 1881 – A library, smoking and billiard room, and a bowling alley were constructed for the amusement of the inmates.
- 1882 – The population of the hospital was one hundred and ninety-two at a monthly cost of $3,967 per inmate. A printing office and a scroll saw shop were established in which certain inmates were allowed to work. These were for the better class of patients who felt themselves superior to hard manual labor. For another class, who were not to particular, a brush shop was established which rapidly sprung into success.
- 1883 – The industrial pursuits had increased to such an extent that seventy-five percent of the patients under treatment found daily occupation. Of these, one hundred and fifty were employed in improving the grounds; sixty-four in the brush shop, and the remainder as butchers, bakers, laundrymen, machinists, plasterers, painters, shoemakers and tailors. Ward building No. 1 for female patients, which had not been built at first owing to lack of funds, was erected and occupied during this time.
- 1884 – Two more buildings were erected for the occupancy of those who were unable to perform bodily functions properly without constant supervision.
- 1885 – The system of irrigation sewage was enlarged – a large portion of the work being done by the patients. An infirmary was erected to accommodate about one hundred patients and was one-story high and surrounded by verandas. The library was increased so that it contained nearly one thousand volumes and picnics were often held.
- 1886 – The population grew increasingly large that two frame barracks were erected holding about one hundred patients each. The offal of the establishment were used as fertilizer for the grounds, which assumed the proportions of a well regulated farm supplying all the sausage, scrapple, lard and poultry used by the institution. A farm cottage was erected to accommodate sixteen patients who were delegated to engage in agricultural pursuits.
- 1887 – The male and female infirmaries were made ready for occupancy. During this time, a mild attack of typhoid fever broke out afflicting twenty-one patients – all but two recovered. Clubs were also established and a large refectory or general dining room gave great satisfaction to five hundred patients.
- 1891 – Forty acres were purchased by the authority of the Commonwealth as an epidemic of dysentery carried off a number of patients to their grave.
- 1893 – $7,500 was appropriated by the Legislature to drill and test artesian wells. Six wells were drilled varying from four hundred to five hundred feet in depth yielding an ample supply of water and a reservoir was constructed holding nearly three and one-half million gallons of water.
- 1894 – A full electric light system was installed by which all the buildings were lighted and a few arc lights were also placed upon the grounds. One hundred and forty-two cows had to be killed this year when they became infected with tuberculosis at a loss of $6,000. The basement of the chapel building has in it a medical library, a dining room for employees and a general store room. The chapel is a large room, finely lighted by windows. A complete drug store with a resident druggist is found in the male and female departments and three private rooms were established in each ward for isolation. An ample and light building is used as the kitchen and bake house, and the cooking done by steam with a large refrigerator adjoining the kitchen. Two thousand loaves of bread were turned out on an average daily basis along with biscuits and gingerbread on certain days of the week.
- 1896 – Dr. Bennett resigned from her position as resident physician of the Female Department.
- 1895 – A training school was established in the Male Department for nurses. Two years later, a similar school for Female nurses opened.
- 1897 – An additional assistant physician was added to each department. On October 1 there were 1,102 male and 1,048 female patients.
- 1899 – A cottage on the grounds was fitted up for the segregation of female tubercular patients, which provided room for twenty cases.
- 1900 – Two large ward buildings were completed, appeals for which had been made for years to the Legislature, because of the overcrowded conditions. They are two stories high and have on each floor two large dormitories, with a large day room in between them. They were intended for the quiet working class and accommodate 250 patients.
- 1904 – The infirmary for men was placed entirely in charge of female nurses and a nurses' home was erected at a cost of $55,000 with a capacity for one hundred and ten nurses.
- 1906 – The hospital suffered a great loss in the sudden death of its chief physician, Dr. David Dorrington Richardson. A modern pathological laboratory building, with morgue, was occupied and included a mortuary chapel, museum and offices.
- 1907 – A destructive fire almost destroyed ward building No. 11. Fortunately the fire occurred early in the evening and by prompt action all the inmates were saved and no one was injured. In May, a convalescent building was constructed at a cost of $50,000 and accommodated roughly seventy women.
- A card-index system for the enrollment and classification of patients was inaugurated and the folder system of recording the histories of cases was amplified and modernized.
- Hydrotherapy in the form of cold and neutral packs was introduced.
- 1908 – A surgical building, equipped with a modern operating room and necessary accessory rooms, was erected at a cost of about $3,000.
- Three barn buildings were burned and several of the season's crops were destroyed. They were replaced with modern buildings.
- 1909 – A modern assembly hall was completed and occupied in September. The lower floor being a dancing hall, while the upper floor contains an auditorium for chapel and assembly purposes, with sloping floor, large stage and fixed theater seats for one thousand two hundred patients. A $5,000 pipe organ was installed through the generosity of the Legislature.
- $30,000 was appropriated for new plumbing, all old bath-rooms and closets to be torn out and modern shower baths, tubs and closets were installed, and the floors were tiled.
- 1910 – Continuous baths were installed throughout the institution and the position of resident dentist was created.
- 1949 – A brick building was erected on the campus to house the nursing staff. Although no longer used for that purpose, it still stands today and is known as Building 57. It is a four-story building located near the Gate 4 entrance to the State Hospital campus. It currently houses the State Hospital psychology department, medical records, a credit union, and several other hospital related and non-hospital related tenants.

== See also ==
- Friends Hospital
- Haverford State Hospital
- Mental Health
- Pennsylvania Hospital
- Philadelphia State Hospital
- Psychiatric Hospital
- Harrisburg State Hospital
- Arthur Percy Noyes
- Pennsylvania State Hospitals
