= Arthur Percy Noyes =

American physician

- Born: 1880; Enfield, New Hampshire, United States
- Died: August 21, 1963 (aged 82–83); Philadelphia, Pennsylvania, United States
- Education: Kimball Union Academy, Dartmouth College, University of Pennsylvania (MD, 1906)
- Known for: Psychiatry
- Scientific career
- Fields: Neurology, Psychiatry, Nursing
- Workplaces: Norristown State Hospital

Arthur Percy Noyes, M.D. (1880–1963) was a physician, psychiatric hospital administrator and medical educator, In his career he published a number of textbooks and articles that relate to the modernization of psychiatric practices, outpatient care and the need for life-long education for medical staff.

He was born in Enfield, New Hampshire, of Puritan stock who emigrated to the American colonies from England in 1633. His early education was in a one-room schoolhouse and later at the Kimball Union Academy in Meriden, New Hampshire. He entered Dartmouth College in 1899 and worked his way through college by teaching in rural areas. After his college graduation in 1902, he entered the University of Pennsylvania medical school. He graduated in 1906. He interned for one year at the City Hospital in New York City and then spent several years in general practice in New York and Connecticut.

Noyes returned to Philadelphia for one year of graduate study in internal medicine and neurology, and then entered the field of psychiatry at the Boston Psychopathic Hospital. From 1916 to 1920, he was an assistant physician and executive officer at the hospital.

In 1920, Noyes moved to Washington, D.C., to join the medical staff at the St. Elizabeths Hospital. He served under William A. White, the superintendent, who was a leader in psychiatry and in the administration of psychiatric hospitals.

In 1929, Noyes moved to Rhode Island to become the superintendent of the state's mental hospital. He stayed until 1936 when he moved to the state mental hospital in Norristown, Pennsylvania, where he remained for 19 years until he retired. He had a productive tenure at these hospitals: modernizing the facilities, developing teaching curricula for medical students from the University of Pennsylvania and the Jefferson Medical School. He is also credited with creating a psychiatric residency training programs which last for over fifty years.

Noyes wrote A Textbook on Psychiatry for Students and Graduates in Schools of Nursing in 1936. Noyes's teaching activities led to publication of his textbook Modern Clinical Psychiatry. His textbook was widely used in medical schools when it was first published in 1934.

He was president of the Philadelphia Psychiatric Society and the Pennsylvania Psychiatric Society. At the American Psychiatric Association, he served on the Committees of Nursing Standards and Policies, the council, the executive committee, and as president from 1954 to 1955. His presidential address stressed the importance of studying the humanities in psychiatric education.

== Select Works and Publications ==
- Noyes, Arthur Percy. A Textbook of Psychiatry for Students and Graduates in Schools of Nursing. New York, Macmillan, 1927
- Noyes, Arthur Percy. Modern Clinical Psychiatry. Philadelphia: W.B. Saunders, 1934
- Noyes, Arthur Percy. A Textbook of Psychiatry. New York, Macmillan, 1936
