= Hiram Corson =

American professor of literature and writer

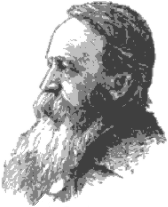
- Born: November 6, 1828; Philadelphia, Pennsylvania, US
- Died: June 15, 1911 (aged 82); Ithaca, New York, US
- Spouse: Caroline Rollin

Academic work
- Discipline: literature
- Institutions: Smithsonian Institution; Girard College; St. John's College; Cornell University

Hiram Corson (November 6, 1828 – June 15, 1911) was an American professor of literature.

== Life ==
Corson was born in Philadelphia, Pennsylvania. He held a position in the library of the Smithsonian Institution, Washington, D.C. (1849–1856), was a lecturer on English literature in Philadelphia (1859–1865), and was professor of English at Girard College, Philadelphia (1865–1866), and in St. John's College in Annapolis, Maryland (1866–1870). In 1870-1871 he was professor of rhetoric and oratory at Cornell University, where he was professor of Anglo-Saxon and English literature (1872–1886), of English literature and rhetoric (1886–1890), and from 1890 to 1903 (when he became professor emeritus) of English literature, a chair formed for him. His papers are held at Cornell University.

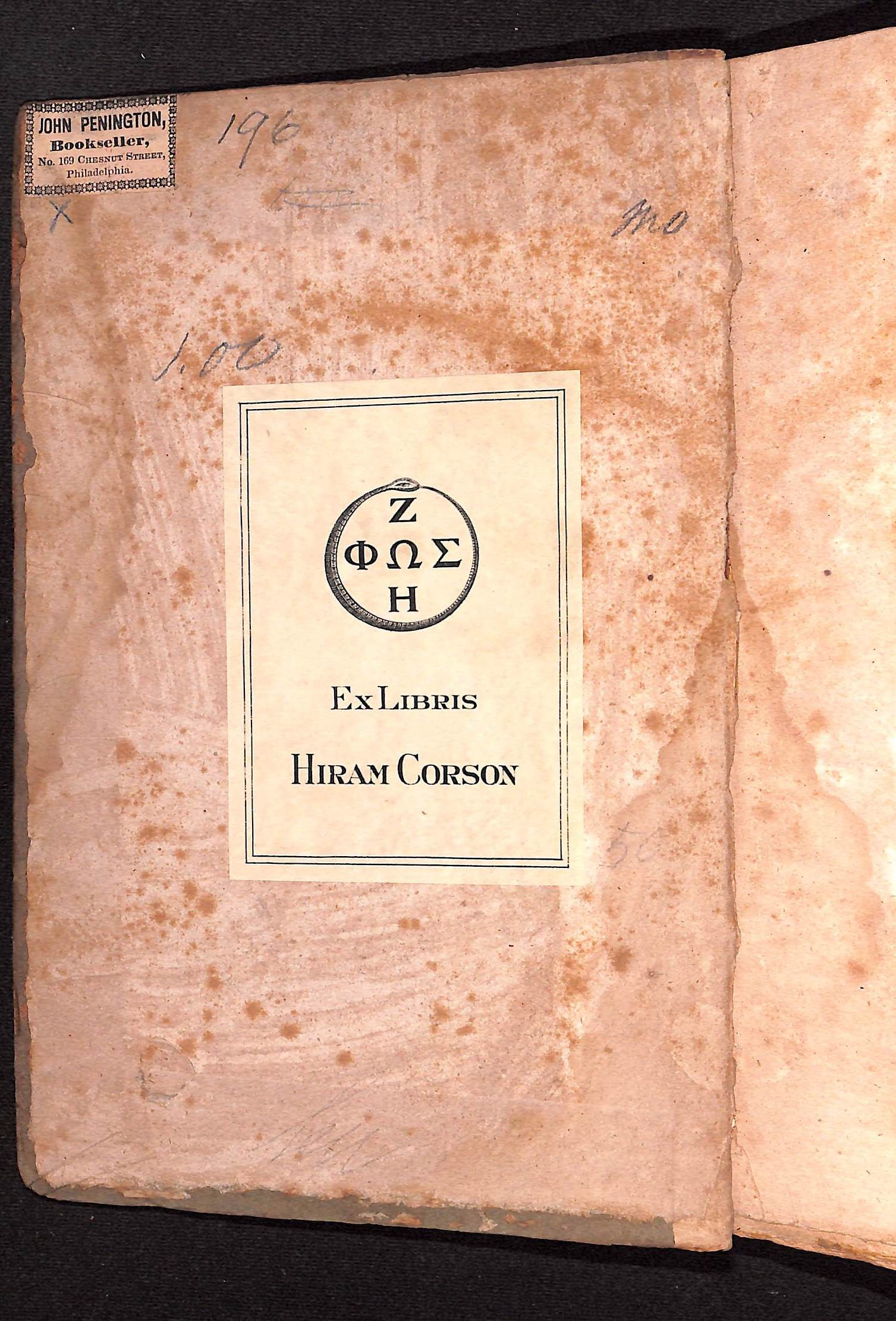
Bookplate of Hiram Corson (1828–1911) affixed to the inside cover of William Hazlitt's Lectures on the English Comic Writers (1819), reflecting Corson's personal connection to the literary world.

== Works ==
- Chaucer's Legende of Goode Women (editor). 1863.
- An Elocutionary Manual. Charles Desilver. 1864.
- Satires of Juvenal (translator). 1868.
- A Hand-Book of Anglo-Saxon and Early English. Holt & Williams. 1871.
- Jottings on the Text of Hamlet. 1874. (The reference to Jottings on the Text of Macbeth in the 1911 Encyclopædia Britannica article appears to be a mistake for Jottings on the Text of Hamlet.)
- The University of the Future. 1875.
- An introduction to the study of Robert Browning's poetry. D.C. Heath & Co. 1830.
- An Introduction to the Study of William Shakespeare. D.C. Heath & Co. 1889.
- A Primer of English Verse. Ginn. 1893.
- The Aims of Literary Study. 1895.
- The Voice and Spiritual Education. 1896.
- Selections from Chaucer's Canterbury Tales (editor). 1896.
- An Introduction to the Study of Milton. 1899.
- The voice and spiritual education. Macmillan. 1904.

He edited a translation by his wife, Caroline Rollin, of Pierre Janet's Mental State of Hystericals (1901).
