= Sherman House (Alma, Wisconsin) =

- U.S. National Register of Historic Places
- Location within Wisconsin Location within the United States
- Location: 301 S. Main St., Alma, Wisconsin
- Coordinates: 44°19′18″N 91°54′54″W
- Area: 0.1 acres (0.040 ha)
- Built: 1866
- Architectural style: Greek Revival, Other, Federal, Vernacular
- NRHP reference No.: 79000063
- Added to NRHP: August 14, 1979

The Sherman House is a historic former hotel in Alma, Wisconsin. The hotel was built in 1866 and originally owned by William Kraft. It was named for Civil War general William Tecumseh Sherman. John Buehler, the first sheriff of Buffalo County, bought the hotel in 1872. The hotel is now a private residence.

The Sherman House was added to the National Register of Historic Places on August 14, 1979. It is also part of the Alma Historic District, which was added to the National Register in 1982.
