= List of ships named Scotia =

Numerous vessels have borne the name Scotia or Scotian, named after Scotia, an ancient name for Scotland, including:

- PS Scotia (1828), a passenger steamer built for service between Glasgow and Dublin, and later the first steam vessel owned in Malta
- PS Scotia (1845), a passenger steamer operating between Glasgow and Stranraer until 1863, then an American Civil War blockade runner
- PS Scotia (1847), a passenger steamer in service between England and Ireland from 1847 to 1861, then an American Civil War blockade runner
- RMS Scotia (1861), a British passenger paddle steamship operated by the Cunard Line on the North Atlantic
- Scotia (1876), a barque-rigged research vessel used by the Scottish National Antarctic Expedition of 1902-1905
- PS Scotia (1898), a British Columbia paddle steamer in use on the River Yukon until 1917, destroyed by fire in 1967
- SS Scotian (1898), passenger liner with Allan Line and Canadian Pacific from 1911, built as Statendam
- TSS Scotia (1902), in service with the London and North Western Railway until 1920
- TSS Scotia (1920), in service with the London and North Western Railway and the London, Midland and Scottish Railway until sunk in 1940
