= Johnny Nilsson =

American speed skater (1875–1955)

John Nilsson
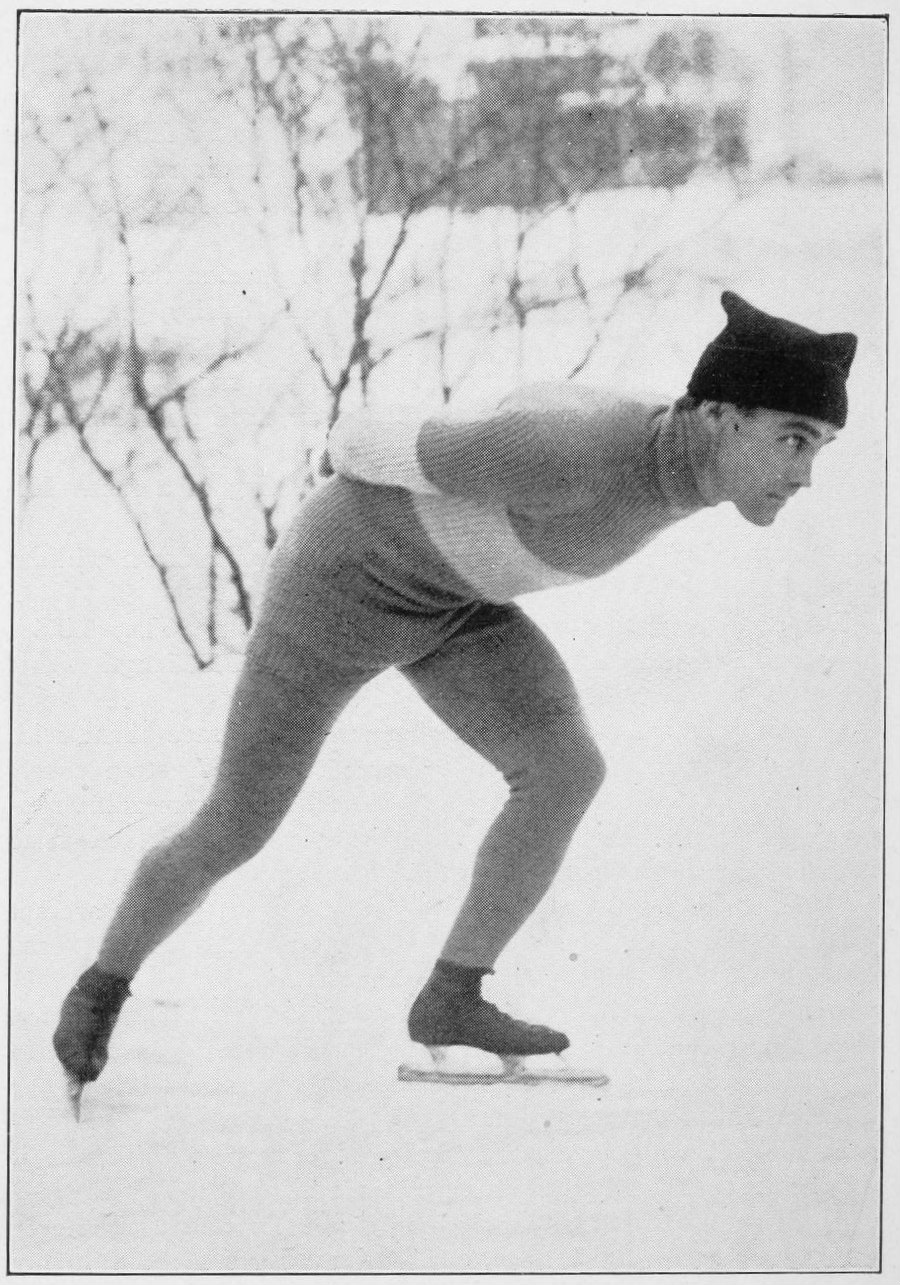

Personal information
- Born: 8 July 1875
- Died: 3 December 1955 (aged 80) Tujunga, California, USA

Sport
- Sport: Speed skating

John Nilsson (8 July 1875 – 3 December 1955) was an American amateur and professional speed skater primarily active during the late 1890s and the first decade of the 20th century.

Johnny Nilsson, during his active career as a speed skater, made his home in Minneapolis. Outside of speed skating he was also a fine oarsman, paddler, sprinter, gymnast, tumbler, boxer and wrestler.

Nilsson died in Tujunga, California at an age of 80.
