= James H. Wilson Hall =

- Domestic Science Building
- U.S. National Register of Historic Places
- U.S. Historic district – Contributing property
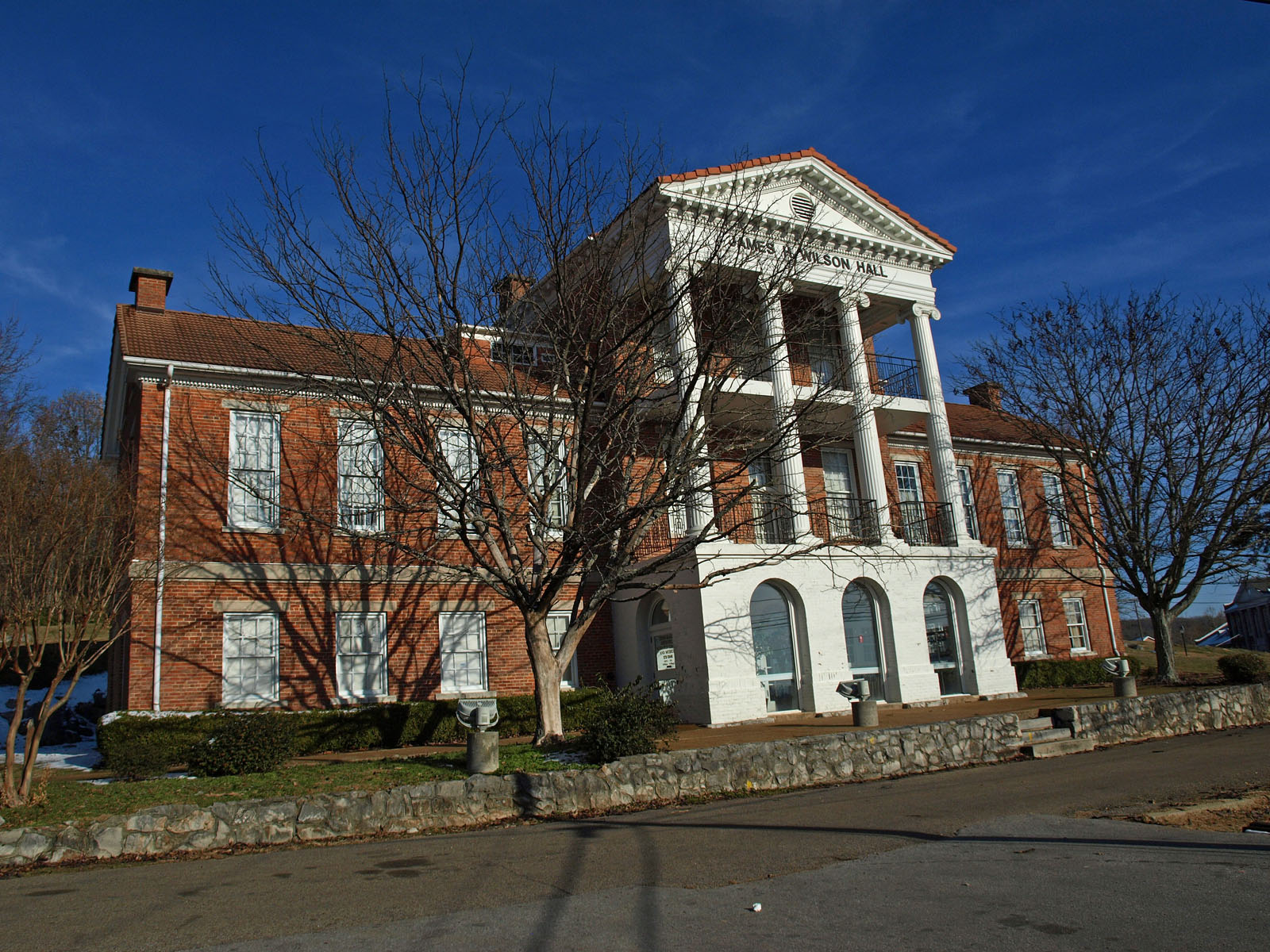
- The building in December 2010

- Location within Huntsville, Alabama Location within Alabama Location within the United States
- Location: Alabama A&M University campus, Huntsville, Alabama
- Coordinates: 34°47′7″N 86°34′9″W
- Area: less than one acre
- Architectural style: Classical
- Part of: Alabama Agricultural and Mechanical University Historic District (ID01001407)
- NRHP reference No.: 73000358

Significant dates
- Added to NRHP: April 11, 1973
- Designated CP: December 31, 2001

James H. Wilson Hall (formerly known as the Councill Domestic Science Building) is a historic building on the campus of Alabama A&M University in Huntsville, Alabama. Construction began in 1911, and was completed in 1912.State Black Archives The funds were a gift from the Robert R. McCormick family. It served as the university's home economics building until 1968, when it was partly taken over by the art department until 1970. It was vacant until 1990, when the building was restored and taken over by the State Black Archives Research Center and Museum, which was established in 1987.

The center portion of the building is three stories, with a gable roof running front-to-back. The main entrance is inside an enclosed lobby of white painted brick which features three windowed arches on the front and arches with glass doors on either side. Above the lobby is a two-story pedimented portico, supported by four Ionic columns, with a third-floor balcony. On either side of the main block, set back from the portico, are 2 four-bay, two-story wings. Windows on the first floor façade are six-over-six sashes, while the second and third floors are nine-over-nine. The roof is covered in red tile with a decorative finial on the gable ends. The cornice is decorated with small dentils on the wings, and larger ones on the architrave.

The building was listed on the National Register of Historic Places in 1973.
