= Companion (caregiving) =

Healthcare occupation

In health care and caregiving, a companion, sitter, or private duty is a job title for someone hired to work with one patient (or occasionally two). Companions work in a variety of settings, including nursing homes, assisted living facilities, hospitals, and private homes, and their duties range from advanced medical care to simple companionship and observation. They may be qualified, for example as a nursing assistant.

== Types of caregiving based on the location ==
=== Hospitals ===
In hospitals, sitters are hired by the hospital for patients who cannot remain unsupervised for even a short period of time. These include patients who are at risk for injury to themselves or others due to disorientation or combativeness, and those whose vital signs are severely unstable. Companions also work on psychiatric wards or in mental institutions, caring for patients who have been observed attempting suicide. This is known as suicide watch or intense suicide observation.

=== Nursing homes ===
In a nursing home or assisted living facility, a companion or sitter is often hired by the resident or his/her family to provide personal care to the patient at a level that cannot be provided by the facility's nursing staff, in which each member is responsible for a much larger number of patients. These private duty nurses and aides may provide more immediate and detailed service, whereas facility staff can only reach the patient in turn and provide less frequent, rudimentary care. Companions in nursing homes also provide social companionship.

Nursing homes, like hospitals, sometimes hire sitters to watch patients who are at risk for injury to themselves or suicide.

=== Private homes ===
An aide providing care to one or more persons in a private home is generally referred to as a home health aide.

Companions are sometimes hired to help with non-medical tasks, such as cooking, cleaning, driving, or social interaction, without providing hands-on care.

Companions are sometimes directly hired privately by clients or their families. In many cases, clients or their families obtain companion care services by utilizing the services of in-home care companies. Some in-home care companies act as the employer of the caregivers that they send out to clients' homes. Other in-home care companies take the approach that the caregivers are not employees of the companies, and instead may be independent contractors or employees of the clients, depending upon the degree of supervision and control exercised by the clients or their families over the caregivers' activities and tasks.

In the United States, the laws regulating companion care in private homes vary from state to state. Some states, such as Tennessee, require home care companies. Others do not. California currently does not provide any licensing nor any consumer protection regulatory oversight over in-home care companies unless those companies are also licensed as "home health agencies" that are specifically licensed to provide skilled nursing care in patients' homes.

== See also ==
- Home health care
- Private duty nursing
- Lady's companion
