= Lovelace =

Lovelace may refer to:

== Peerage ==
- Baron Lovelace
  - Richard Lovelace, 1st Baron Lovelace (c. 1567–1634), English politician and soldier
  - John Lovelace, 2nd Baron Lovelace (1616–1670), British peer and royal servant
  - John Lovelace, 3rd Baron Lovelace (c. 1640–1693), English Whig politician
  - John Lovelace, 4th Baron Lovelace (died 1709), Governor of both New York and New Jersey
- Earl of Lovelace
  - William King-Noel, 1st Earl of Lovelace (1805–1893), English noblemen and scientist
  - Countess Ada Lovelace, (1815–1852), English mathematician and writer
  - Peter King, 5th Earl of Lovelace (1951–2018), British peer

== Fictional characters ==
- Lovelace, a character in the film Happy Feet
- Robert Lovelace, a character in the novel Clarissa by Samuel Richardson
- Simon Lovelace, a character in the Bartimaeus book series by Jonathan Stroud
- The Lovelace Cartel, a drug cartel featured in the Black Lagoon manga series
- Captain Isabel Lovelace, a character in the podcast Wolf 359
- Eva Lovelace, a character in the 1958 film Stage Struck

== Other uses ==
- Lovelace (name)
- Lovelace (crater), a crater on the far side of the Moon
- Lovelace (film), a biopic about the American pornstar Linda Lovelace
- Lovelace: A Rock Musical, about the life of Linda Lovelace
- BCS Lovelace Medal, British Computer Society award named after Ada Lovelace
- Lovelace Respiratory Research Institute, a non-profit biomedical research organization
- Ada Lovelace (microarchitecture), a graphics processing unit (GPU) microarchitecture developed by Nvidia

== See also ==
- Loveless (disambiguation)
