= Wentworth (surname) =

Wentworth is a surname which may refer to:

== People ==
- Ali Wentworth (born 1965), American actress
- Anne Wentworth (disambiguation)
- Anton H. Wentworth (1897–2001), American politician
- Austin Wentworth (born 1990), American football player
- Benning Wentworth (1696–1770), American-born merchant, governor of New Hampshire under kings George II and George III
- Buddy Wentworth (1937–2014), Namibian politician
- Catherine D. Wentworth (1865–1948), American painter
- Cecile de Wentworth (1853–1933), American portrait painter
- D'Arcy Wentworth (1762–1827), surgeon in the early days of Sydney, Australia, and father of William Charles Wentworth I
- D'Arcy Wentworth, Jr. (1793–1861), son of D'Arcy Wentworth, army officer and New South Wales politician
- Erastus Wentworth (1813–1886), American educator, Methodist Episcopal minister and missionary to China
- Finn Wentworth (born 1958), American entrepreneur, philanthropist and investor
- Frederick Wentworth, 3rd Earl of Strafford (1732–1799), British peer
- Harold Wentworth (lexicographer) (1904–1965), American lexicographer
- Henry Wentworth (c. 1448–between 1499 and 1501), de jure Lord Despenser and grandfather of Jane Seymour
- George Wentworth (of Woolley) (1599–1660), English MP for Pontefract 1640–1642
- George Wentworth (of Wentworth Woodhouse) (1609–?), English MP for Pontefract 1640–1644
- George A. Wentworth (1835–1906), American teacher and author of textbooks
- Henrietta Wentworth, 6th Baroness Wentworth (1660–1686), mistress of James Scott, 1st Duke of Monmouth
- Jeff Wentworth (born 1940), member of the Texas State Senate
- John Wentworth (disambiguation)
- Joseph Wentworth (1877–1944), American college football player, coach and lawyer
- K. D. Wentworth (1951–2012), American science fiction writer
- Margery Wentworth (c. 1478–1550), mother of Jane Seymour
- Marion Craig Wentworth (1872–1942), American playwright, poet, and suffragist
- Martha Wentworth (1889–1974), American actress
- Moses J. Wentworth (1848–1922), American politician
- Mungo Wentworth MacCallum (1941–2020), Australian political journalist
- Paul Wentworth (1533–1593), English Member of Parliament
- Paul Wentworth (spy) (c. 1736–1793), British spy, lawyer and plantation owner in Surinam
- Peter Wentworth (1529–1596), English Puritan Member of Parliament, brother of Paul
- Peter Wentworth (Parliamentarian) (1592–1675), English Parliamentarian, grandson of the above Peter
- Philip Wentworth (1424–1464), English knight and Usher of the King's Chamber, great-grandfather of Queen Jane Seymour
- Richard Wentworth (disambiguation)
- Robin Wentworth (1915–1997), British television actor
- Sally Wentworth, pseudonym of Doreen Hornsblow (1936/1937 – 2001), British romance writer
- Sarah Wentworth (1805–1880), Australian litigant who brought the first breach of promise suit in Australia
- Scott Wentworth (born 1955), American actor and director
- Stephen G. Wentworth (1811–1897), founder of Wentworth Military Academy
- Thomas Wentworth (disambiguation)
- Tim Wentworth, (born 1959/1960), American businessman, CEO of pharmacy operator Walgreens Boots Alliance
- Vera Wentworth (1890–1957), British suffragist
- William Wentworth (disambiguation)

== Fictional characters ==
- protagonist of A.J. Wentworth, B.A., a 1982 British sitcom
- Frederick Wentworth (Persuasion), a main character in Jane Austen's novel Persuasion
- Richard Wentworth, a pulp magazine character as The Spider
- Lovey (Wentworth) Howell, wife of Thurston Howell III on the American sitcom Gilligan's Island

== See also ==
- Governor Wentworth (disambiguation)
- Lord Wentworth (disambiguation)
- Senator Wentworth (disambiguation)
- Viscount Wentworth (disambiguation)
