= Anne Lovelace, 7th Baroness Wentworth =

English peeress

The Right Honourable The Lady Wentworth

Personal details
- Born: Anne Wentworth; 29 July 1623
- Died: 7 May 1697 (aged 73)
- Spouse: John Lovelace, 2nd Baron Lovelace (m. 1638; died 1670)
- Relations: Thomas Wentworth, 5th Baron Wentworth (brother); Henrietta Wentworth, 6th Baroness Wentworth (niece)
- Children: John Lovelace, 3rd Baron Lovelace; Hon. Margaret Noel; Hon. Anne Lovelace; Hon. Dorothy Drax
- Parent(s): Thomas Wentworth, 1st Earl of Cleveland; Anne Crofts
- Occupation: Peer

Anne Lovelace, 7th Baroness Wentworth (née Wentworth) (29 July 1623 – 7 May 1697) was an English peeress.

== Early life ==
She was a daughter of Thomas Wentworth, 1st Earl of Cleveland (1591–1667) and the former Anne Crofts (died 1638). Her elder brother Thomas Wentworth was MP for Bedfordshire until he inherited the barony of Wentworth by writ of acceleration in 1640. Their father was a prominent English landowner and Royalist general during the Wars of the Three Kingdoms. After her mother's death in 1638, her father married Lucy Wentworth (a daughter of Sir John Wentworth, 1st Baronet, of Gosfield), with whom he had another daughter, Catherine (who married William Spencer, brother of Nicholas Spencer).

Her paternal grandparents were the former Anne Hopton (a daughter of Sir Owen Hopton) and Henry Wentworth, 3rd Baron Wentworth, who owned an estate near Nettlestead, Suffolk and was one of the judges of Mary, Queen of Scots at Fotheringay in 1586.

== Peerage ==
After her marriage, she became the Baroness Lovelace by virtue of her husband's title. Her elder brother died in 1665, predeceasing their father by two years. His daughter, Henrietta, therefore, succeeded to the barony but his earldom became extinct. Upon Henrietta's death on 23 April 1686, Anne succeeded her unmarried niece as 7th Baroness Wentworth, suo jure, as well as the 11th Baroness le Despencer, de jure.

== Personal life ==
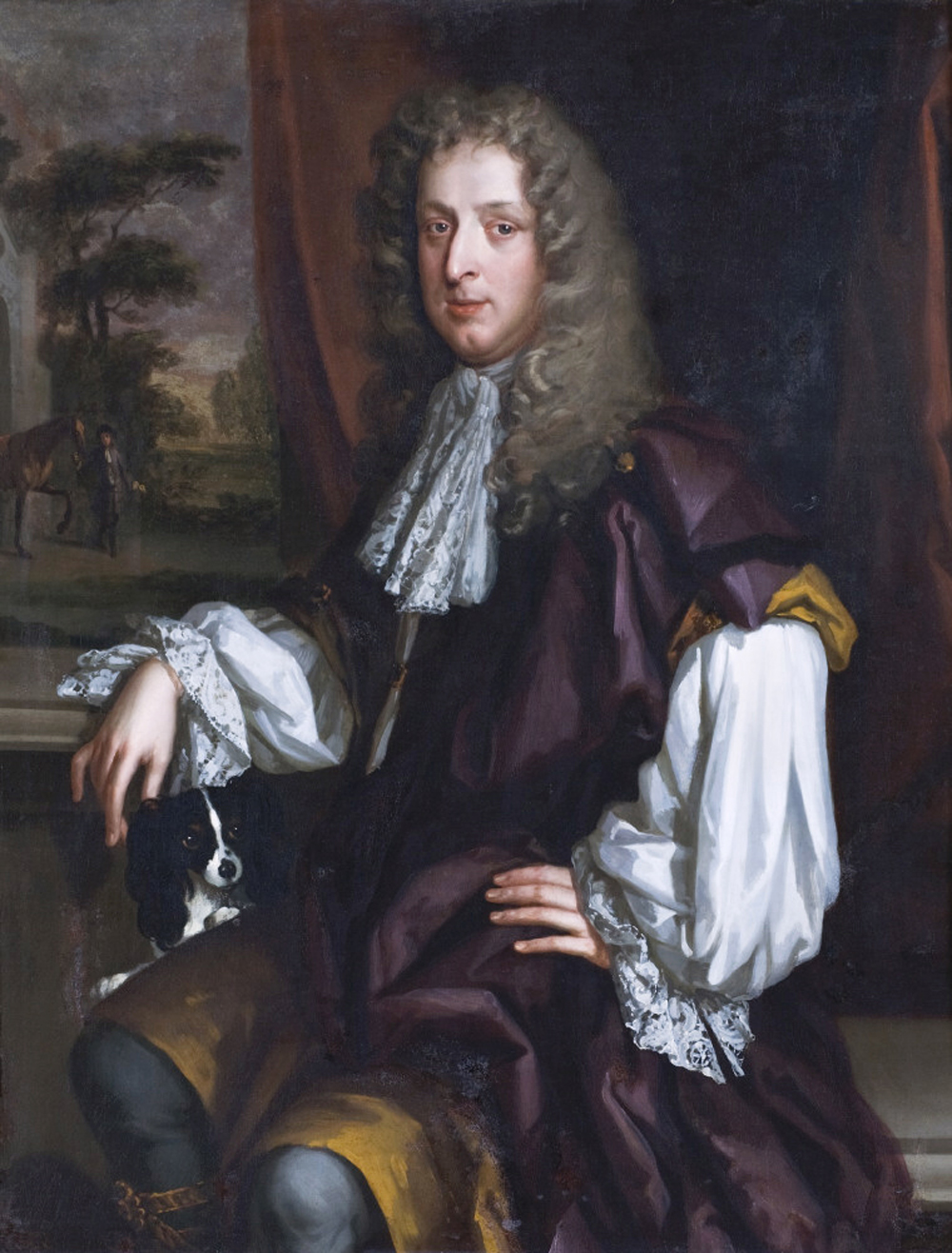
Portrait of her son, John Lovelace, 3rd Baron Lovelace, by Godfrey Kneller, c. 1670

On 11 July 1638, Anne married John Lovelace, 2nd Baron Lovelace (1616–1670), a notoriously heavy drinker who was chronically in debt. He was the son of Richard Lovelace, 1st Baron Lovelace and Margaret Dodworth (the daughter of London merchant William Dodworth) and had inherited his father's barony in 1634. Together, they lived at Ladye Place at Hurley which her husband inherited on the death of his father. Together, they were the parents of:

- John Lovelace, 3rd Baron Lovelace (c. 1640–1693), who married Martha Pye, the daughter and co-heiress of Sir Edmund Pye, 1st Baronet, in 1662.
- Hon. Margaret Lovelace (c. 1644–1671), who married Sir William Noel, 2nd Baronet, in 1660.
- Hon. Anne Lovelace, who died unmarried.
- Hon. Dorothy Lovelace (1650–1684), who married Henry Drax of Drax Hall, a plantation owner in Barbados who was the son of Sir James Drax.

Lord Lovelace died in 1670. Lady Wentworth died on 7 May 1697, after which her title passed to her granddaughter Hon. Martha Johnson (wife of shipbuilder Sir Henry Johnson), as her son, who had inherited his father's barony, predeceased her. Martha also inherited Water Eaton, her estate in Oxfordshire, and Toddington, her estate in Bedfordshire. Upon her son's death, the Lovelace barony passed to his cousin William's son, John Lovelace, 4th Baron Lovelace, who became Governor of the Province of New York.

=== Descendants ===
Through her daughter Margaret, she was a grandmother of Sir Thomas Noel, 3rd Baronet (1662–1688) and Sir John Noel, 4th Baronet (1668–1697). Through Sir John, she was a great-grandmother to Sir Clobery Noel, 5th Baronet, MP for Leicestershire, who was the father of Edward Noel, who succeeded Anne's granddaughter Martha as 9th Baron Wentworth in 1745. He was later created Viscount Wentworth in 1762.

Peerage of England
Preceded by Henrietta Wentworth	Baroness Wentworth; 1686–1697	Succeeded by Martha Johnson
