= Lord Wentworth =

An unqualified reference to Lord Wentworth could mean:

- Thomas Wentworth, 1st Baron Wentworth (1501–1551)
- Thomas Wentworth, 2nd Baron Wentworth (1525–1584)
- Henry Wentworth, 3rd Baron Wentworth (1558–1593)
- Thomas Wentworth, 1st Earl of Cleveland (1591–1667)
- Thomas Wentworth, 1st Earl of Strafford (1593–1641)
- William Wentworth, 2nd Earl of Strafford (1626–1695)
