= Thomas Wentworth =

Thomas Wentworth may refer to:

Ordered chronologically

- Thomas Wentworth I, MP for Suffolk (UK Parliament constituency)
- Thomas Wentworth, 1st Baron Wentworth (1501–1551), Lord Chamberlain of England
- Thomas Wentworth, 2nd Baron Wentworth (1525–1584), his son, blamed for England's loss of Calais to France in 1558
- Thomas Wentworth (Recorder of Oxford) (c. 1568–1627), English Member of Parliament and lawyer
- Thomas Wentworth (died 1638) (1599–1638), his son, English Member of Parliament and lawyer, MP for Oxford (UK Parliament constituency)
- Thomas Wentworth, 1st Earl of Strafford (1593–1641), English statesman, a major figure in the events leading up to the English Civil War
- Thomas Wentworth, 1st Earl of Cleveland (1591–1667), Royalist military leader during the English Civil War
- Thomas Wentworth, 5th Baron Wentworth (1612–1665), his son, Member of Parliament and also a Royalist military leader
- Thomas Wentworth, 1st Earl of Strafford (1672–1739), KG, diplomat and First Lord of the Admiralty
- Thomas Wentworth (British Army officer) (died 1747), English general officer

== See also ==
- Thomas Wentworth Higginson (1823–1911), American minister
- Thomas Watson-Wentworth (1665–1723), English landowner and politician
