= Wentworth =

Wentworth may refer to:

== People and fictional characters ==
- Wentworth (surname), a list of people and fictional characters
- Wentworth (given name), a list of people
- Patricia Wentworth, pen name of British mystery writer Dora Amy Turnbull (1878–1961)
- Judith Blunt-Lytton, 16th Baroness Wentworth (1873–1957), Lady Wentworth, notable Arabian horse breeder
- Wentworth family, in the United States and Australia

== Places ==
=== Australia ===
- Wentworth, New South Wales, a town
- Division of Wentworth, an electoral district in the Australian House of Representatives in New South Wales
- Electoral district of Wentworth, a former electoral district in the New South Wales Legislative Assembly
- Wentworth County, a cadastral division of New South Wales
- Wentworth Shire, a local government area in the Riverina region of New South Wales
- Wentworth Gaol, a former prison in New South Wales
- Wentworth Park, Sydney, New South Wales

=== Canada ===
- Wentworth, Calgary, a community in Calgary, Alberta
- Ski Wentworth, a ski hill in Wentworth, Nova Scotia, Canada
- Wentworth, Nova Scotia, a rural community
- Wentworth, Quebec, a township municipality
- Wentworth County, Ontario, a defunct county
  - Wentworth (electoral district), a former riding in the Canadian House of Commons
  - Wentworth (provincial electoral district), a former riding in the Legislative Assembly of Ontario
  - Wentworth (Province of Canada electoral district), a former riding in the Legislative Assembly of the Province of Canada

=== South Africa ===
- Wentworth, KwaZulu-Natal, a township of Durban

=== United Kingdom ===
- Wentworth, Cambridgeshire, a village
- Wentworth Castle, former seat of the Earls of Strafford, at Stainborough, South Yorkshire, England
- Wentworth Estate, a private estate of large houses in Runnymede, Surrey
- Wentworth, South Yorkshire, a village and civil parish
- Wentworth (UK Parliament constituency), an electoral district in South Yorkshire

=== United States ===
- Wentworth, Missouri, a village
- Wentworth, New Hampshire, a town
- Wentworth, North Carolina, a town
- Wentworth, South Dakota, a village
- Wentworth, Wisconsin, an unincorporated community

== Hotels ==
- Sofitel Sydney Wentworth, originally the Wentworth Hotel, a heritage-listed luxury five-star hotel in Sydney, New South Wales, Australia
- Wentworth by the Sea, formerly the Hotel Wentworth, a historic hotel in New Castle, New Hampshire, United States
- Wentworth Mansion, Charleston, South Carolina, United States, a historic hotel

== Ships ==
- Wentworth, a British cargo ship built in 1919 and sunk in 1943
- HMCS Wentworth, a Canadian frigate launched in 1943 and scrapped in 1947

== Television ==
- Wentworth (TV series), an Australian drama series, a reimagining of Prisoner (see below)
- Wentworth: Halfway Home, an Australian drama series, Wentworth's spin off series
- Wentworth Detention Centre, in the Australian television series Prisoner

== Schools ==
- Wentworth College, York, a college of the University of York
- Wentworth Institute of Technology, a private university in Boston, Massachusetts, United States
- Wentworth Military Academy and College, a former boarding school and college in Lexington, Missouri, United States

== Other uses ==
- Baron Wentworth, a title in the Peerage of England
- Wentworth baronets, five titles, all extinct, four in the Baronetage of England and one in the Baronetage of Great Britain
- J.G. Wentworth, a financial services firm
- Wentworth Invitation, a former men's tennis tournament
- Wentworth Club, a golf club played at the Outing Lawn Tennis Club, Hotel Wentworth
- Wentworth Street, Hamilton, Ontario, Canada
- Wentworth station, a former rapid transit station in Chicago, Illinois, United States

== See also ==
- Wentworth letter, a letter by Joseph Smith, Jr. to the editor of Chicago Democrat explaining the message of the LDS Church
- Wentworth Group of Concerned Scientists, a group of Australian scientists, economists, and business people with conservation interests
- Wentworth scale, a scale for the grain size of sedimentary materials
- Wentworth Woodhouse, a Grade I listed country house in the village of Wentworth, and the largest private house in the UK
