= Wentworth family =

Political family

Wentworth
- Place of origin: England
- Motto: En Dieu est tout (French for 'In God is all')

The members of the Wentworth families of the United States and Australia claimed to be descended from Thomas Wentworth and Jane, the daughter of Sir Oliver Mirfield (d. circa 1522).

The Wentworths of New Hampshire claim to be descended from Thomas's son Oliver. The Wentworth family of Virginia and Maryland, and the Australian Wentworths, claim to be descended from another son, Roger.

Like the Arden, Berkeley, Swinton, and Grindlay families, they claim to be one of few extant British families that can trace its patrilineal descent back to a pre-Norman Anglo-Saxon progenitor.

== United States ==
The Wentworth family was a prominent American political family, mostly based in the British colonies and later U.S. states of New Hampshire, Maryland, and the Commonwealth of Virginia. Its members include:

- William Wentworth (1616–1697), patriarch of the New Hampshire branch of the family, and one of the early settlers of New Hampshire
- Thomas Wentworth, Gentleman (1625–1672), Born into a cadet branch of the ancient Wentworth family, emigrated to Maryland and patented Wentworth-Woodhouse Plantation, named after the Wentworth family seat Wentworth-Woodhouse in Yorkshire.
- John Wentworth (1671–1731), grandson of William Wentworth, and Lieutenant Governor of the Province of New Hampshire. As the Governor of New Hampshire at the time was simultaneously Governor of the Province of Massachusetts, the Lieutenant Governors of New Hampshire served with considerable power over the colony.
- Benning Wentworth (1696–1770), first independent colonial Governor of New Hampshire who was not also Governor of Massachusetts
- John Wentworth (1719–1781), a grandson of Lieutenant Governor John Wentworth, and cousin to the colonial governor of the same name, the 1st Baronet Wentworth. He was a judge, a colonel in the colonial militia, and sided with the revolutionary cause against his cousin.
- Sir John Wentworth, 1st Baronet (1737–1820), a grandson of Lieutenant Governor John Wentworth through his son Mark, nephew of Benning Wentworth, and loyalist colonial Governor of New Hampshire during the American Revolution.
- John Wentworth Jr. (1745–1787), son of Judge John Wentworth, and New Hampshire representative to the Continental Congress. Like his father, he was a revolutionary sympathizer and member of the New Hampshire Committee of Safety.
- Sarah Wentworth Apthorp Morton (1759–1846), poet
- Stephen G. Wentworth (1811–1897), descendant of William Wentworth and founder of the Wentworth Military Academy and College in Missouri.
- Erastus Wentworth (1813–1886), a Christian missionary to China
- John Wentworth (1815–1888), born in New Hampshire, but migrated to Chicago where he was elected to the U.S. House of Representatives from Illinois and also Mayor of Chicago
- Moses J. Wentworth (1848–1922), nephew of Mayor John Wentworth of Chicago, and his protégé. He would himself serve in the Illinois House of Representatives
- Hunt Wentworth (1895–1929), son of Moses J. Wentworth

== Australia ==
- D'Arcy Wentworth (1762–1827) was born in Portadown, County Armagh, Ireland and emigrated to Australia in 1790 as an assistant surgeon to the then new colony of New South Wales. D'Arcy Wentworth was a descendant of another D'Arcy Wentworth, born in 1640, who had gone to Ireland. That second D'Arcy was in turn a descendant of William Wentworth of Wentworth Woodhouse in the thirteenth century. He came from Mattersey Hall, North Elmsall, Yorkshire, and was a member of a collateral branch of the family of Thomas Wentworth, 1st Earl of Strafford, also of Wentworth Woodhouse.
- William Charles Wentworth (1790–1872) was an Australian explorer, journalist, politician and author, and one of the leading figures of early colonial New South Wales. He was the first native-born Australian to achieve a reputation overseas, and a leading advocate for self-government for the Australian colonies, son of D'Arcy Wentworth.
- D'Arcy Wentworth Jr. (1793–1861), son of D'Arcy Wentworth, was from 1843 to 1845 a member of the New South Wales Legislative Council.
- "Bill" Wentworth AO (1907–2003), Australian politician, was a Liberal and later Independent member of the Australian House of Representatives from 1949 to 1977, with a reputation as a fierce anti-Communist. He was the great grandson of William Charles Wentworth (1790–1872).

== Internal and external links ==
- Wentworth (surname)
- Wentworth (disambiguation)
- Wentworth World Wide: Facebook group
- Extinct and Dormant Baronetcies by John Burke and John Bernard Burke: London Scott Webster and Geary 1838: Wentworth, of North Elmsal, p.559
- WENTWORTH3 Tudor Court: Tudor England Peerage: Elizabethan Peerage: Wentworth of Nettlestead: Thomas Wentworth. (This website may not be strictly authoritative, but it is consistent with the references, and by using the links, you can go backward or forward in time.)
