= Lovelace (name) =

Lovelace is a surname and a given name. Notable people with the name include:

== Surname ==
- Ada Lovelace (1815–1852), English mathematician
- Alan M. Lovelace (1929–2018), American bureaucrat
- Amanda Lovelace (born 1991), American poet
- Avril Lovelace-Johnson, Ghanaian jurist
- Carey Lovelace, American journalist
- Carl Lovelace (1878–1941), American politician
- Che Lovelace (born 1969), Trinidadian artist
- Claud Lovelace (1934–2012), English physicist
- Creighton Lovelace (born 1981), American pastor
- Dede Lovelace, American skateboarder
- Delos W. Lovelace (1894–1967), American author
- Earl Lovelace (born 1935), Trinidadian writer
- Eldridge Lovelace (1913–2008), American urban planner
- Francis Lovelace (1621–1675), English politician
- George Lovelace (1936–2020), American army officer and politician
- James J. Lovelace (born 1948), American general
- John Lovelace, 2nd Baron Lovelace (1616–1670), English peer
- John Lovelace, 3rd Baron Lovelace (1641–1693), English politician
- John Lovelace, 4th Baron Lovelace (1672–1709), English politician
- Jonathan Bell Lovelace (1895–1979), American businessman
- Josh Lovelace, American musician
- Kawan Lovelace (born 1976), Belizean athlete
- Kelley Lovelace, American musician
- Kenny Lovelace (born 1936), American musician
- Kimara Lovelace, American musician
- Linda Lovelace (1949–2002), American pornstar
- Maki Annette Lovelace (born 1951), American-Japanese singer better known as "Carmen Maki"
- Mary Lovelace O'Neal (born 1942), American artist
- Maud Hart Lovelace (1892–1980), American writer
- Richard Lovelace, 1st Baron Lovelace (1564–1634), English politician
- Richard Lovelace (1618–1657), English poet
- Richard V. E. Lovelace, American astrophysicist
- Sandra Lovelace Nicholas (born 1948), Canadian indigenous activist and senator
- Stacey Lovelace-Tolbert (born 1974), American basketball player
- Tom Lovelace (1897–1979), American baseball player
- Vance Lovelace (born 1963), American baseball player
- Walter L. Lovelace (1831–1866), Missouri lawyer and politician
- William Lovelace (died 1577), English politician
- William Randolph Lovelace II (1907–1965), American physician

== Given name ==
- Lovelace Ackah (born 1976), Ghanaian footballer
- Lovelace Stamer (1829–1908), English bishop
- Lovelace Watkins (1938–1995), American singer
- Henderson Lovelace Lanham (1888–1957), American politician
- Mary Lovelace Schapiro (born 1955), American bureaucrat
- Sandra Lovelace Nicholas (born 1948), Canadian politician and activist
- Sharon Lovelace Blackburn (born 1950), American judge
- William Lovelace Walton (1788–1865), British army officer
