= Governor Byng =

Governor Byng may refer to:

- Robert Byng (18th-century MP) (1703–1740), Governor of Barbados from 1739 to 1740
- George Byng, 7th Viscount Torrington (1812–1884), Governor of Ceylon from 1847 to 1850
- John Byng (1704–1757), Commodore-Governor of Newfoundland Colony in 1742
