= Martha Beauclerk =

British courtier

- Born: Martha Lovelace
- Died: 5 March 1788
- Spouse: Lord Henry Beauclerk
- Parent(s): Catherine and John Lovelace, fourth Baron Lovelace

Martha Beauclerk born Hon. Martha Lovelace and sometimes known after marriage as Lady Henry Beauclerk (1709/10 – 5 March 1788) was a British courtier. She was ambitious and gained preferment in court circles.

== Life ==
Beauclerk was baptised on 10 January 1710 in Westminster St James after her father died the year before. Her parents were Catherine and John Lovelace, fourth Baron Lovelace. Her father had been the Governor of New York when he died. She lacked the riches to go with her social position, but she inherited the Buckinghamshire manor of Leckhampstead and a nearby manor known as Heyborne Fields from distant cousins Martha Johnson, Baroness Wentworth and Mrs Cresswell. This included the right to appoint new clergy to the living in Leckhampstead.

She was ambitious and set her sights on gaining patronage for herself or her family members. In 1732 due to the presumed intercession of her family she was made a maid of honour to Queen Caroline in 1732. In 1736 her brother died and Horace Walpole, who was a friend and part of the network she had established in court, wrote poetry for her, as did Mary Jones.

On 25 June 1739 she became the second wife of Lord Henry Beauclerk who, like herself, had a social position well above his financial position. He was "a younger son" who was in the army and he had made a name for himself, in 1727, during the Thirteenth siege of Gibraltar. He rose to be a colonel but he ended his career when it was said that he refused to be posted to Minorca with the rest of his regiment. He was stripped of his rank and he was never appointed to any other position. Horace Walpole suggested that her husband had really been stripped of his position by the Duke of Cumberland because he had disagreed with the Duke's position at a Court Martial and that the reason was given was just a pretext.

== Death and legacy ==
During her lifetime she had given her only son Henry the living of rector at Leckhampstead and he inherited the manor. She also owned over a thousand pounds worth of South Sea stock and this left equally to any of her daughters who were not married.

In 1863 her will was brought in as evidence in a case discussed in the House of Lords concerning the rights of Martha Johnson to be the 8th Baroness Wentworth.

== Private life ==
She and Henry had seven children. Their middle child was Henry their only son born in 1745. The other six daughters were Diana, Henrietta and Mary (born annually between 1741 and 1743 and then Charlotte in 1746, Martha in 1747 and finally Anne who was born in 1749.
