= Mary Jones (poet) =

English poet (1707–1778)

Mary Jones (8 March 1707 – 10 February 1778) was an English poet.

== Biography ==
Jones was born in Oxford, where her father, Oliver, was a cooper. Her elder brother, named Oliver like his father, became precentor and senior chaplain of Christ Church, Oxford.

Jones learnt French and Italian in childhood. Despite living modestly with her brother in Oxford for most of her life, by 1730 she had become a friend of the Hon. Martha Lovelace, who was a daughter of John Lovelace, 4th Baron Lovelace and a Maid of Honour to Queen Caroline. Jones wrote poems in private letters to Lovelace and her well-connected circle of female friends and relations. Through them, Jones was able to occasionally leave Oxford, and stay at their country houses.

In April 1742, she was surprised to discover that one of her works, The Lass of the Hill, had been published without her knowledge, around the same time as her epitaph to Lord Aubrey Beauclerk was printed by his widow without consulting Jones. Jones was modest about her poetry, and apparently did not consider publishing her efforts until pushed to do so by her friends.

In 1750, her wealthy friends financed the publication of Miscellanies in Prose and Verse, which was to be her only volume of poetry published, though individual poems appeared in The London Magazine in 1752 and the anthology Poems by Eminent Ladies in 1755. The book was well-received, and was given "a long and glowing review" by Ralph Griffiths.

Samuel Johnson, who met Jones on his visits to Oxford, called her "the Chantress", and Thomas Warton recalled her as "a most sensible, agreeable and amiable woman". In her Epistle to Lady Bowyer, Jones admits to being overshadowed by Alexander Pope, who is clearly an influence in her writings. Her poetry is witty and gently satirical, and pokes mild fun at courtly manners, but is never vicious or biting.

Jones was postmistress of Oxford at her death, and was buried there on 14 February 1778.
