= John Wentworth =

John Wentworth may refer to:

== People associated with New Hampshire ==
- John Wentworth (lieutenant governor, born 1671) (1671–1730), lieutenant governor of New Hampshire from 1717 to 1730; grandfather of Sir John Wentworth
- Sir John Wentworth, 1st Baronet (1737–1820), governor of New Hampshire from 1767 to 1775 and Nova Scotia from 1792 to 1808; grandson of the earlier lieutenant governor
- John Wentworth (judge) (1719–1781), jurist and revolutionary leader in New Hampshire; father of the Continental Congress delegate
- John Wentworth Jr. (1745–1787), Continental Congress delegate from New Hampshire; son of the above judge

== People in other locations ==
- John Wentworth (MP for Bishop's Lynn), see King's Lynn (UK Parliament constituency)
- John Wentworth (died 1613), MP
- John Wentworth (died 1651), MP for Great Yarmouth (UK Parliament constituency)
- John Wentworth (Illinois politician) (1815–1888), Chicago mayor and U.S. congressman
- John Wentworth (actor) (1908–1989), British television actor

== See also ==
- John Wentworth-FitzWilliam (1852–1889), British Liberal politician
- New Hampshire Route 109, a segment of which is signed as "The Governor John Wentworth Highway"
