= Governor Lovelace =

Governor Lovelace may refer to:

- John Lovelace, 4th Baron Lovelace (1672–1709), Governor of New York and New Jersey from 1708 to 1709
- Francis Lovelace (1621–1675), 2nd Colonial Governor of New York from 1668 to 1673
