= Lord Lovelace =

Lord Lovelace may refer to:

- Baron Lovelace
- Earl of Lovelace
