= Wedgeworth =

Wedgeworth is a surname. Notable people with the surname include:

- Ann Wedgeworth (1934–2017), American actress
- Colby Wedgeworth, American music producer
- Marsha Wedgeworth, a.k.a. Marsha Blackburn, (born 1952), American politician and businesswoman
- Robert Wedgeworth, American librarian

== See also ==
- Wedgeworth, Alabama
- Wentworth
