= Wentworth (given name) =

Wentworth is a masculine given name borne by:

- Wentworth Beaumont (disambiguation), four viscounts and one baron
- Wentworth Cheswill (1746–1817), considered by some to be the first African-American man elected to public office and the first African-American judge in the United States
- Wentworth Dilke (1810–1869), English art patron, horticulturalist and politician
- S. Wentworth Horton (1885–1960), New York state senator
- Wentworth Arthur Matthew (1892–1973), Kittitian-American religious leader
- Wentworth Miller (born 1972), American actor
- Wentworth Webster (1828–1907), British Anglican clergyman, scholar and collector of folk tales of the Basque Country
