= Richard Powle =

English lawyer and politician

Sir Richard Powle (1628 – 12 July 1678) of Shottesbrooke Park, Berkshire was an English lawyer and politician who sat in the House of Commons from 1660 to 1678.

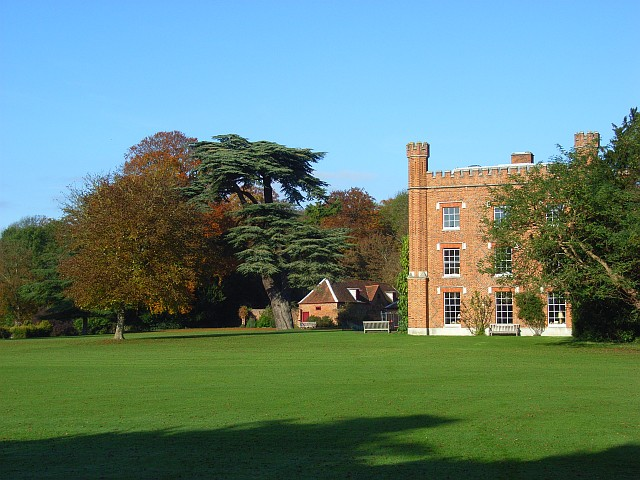
Shottesbrooke Park

Powle was born at Shottesbrooke, the eldest son of Henry Powle, and his wife Katherine Herbert, daughter of Matthew Herbert of Monmouth, Monmouthshire and was baptised on 17 July 1628. His father was Sheriff for Berkshire in 1633 Powle matriculated at Christ Church, Oxford on 16 December 1646, aged 18. In 1654 he was called to the bar at Lincoln's Inn. He inherited Shottesbrooke Park from his father in 1646.

In 1660, Powle was elected Member of Parliament for Berkshire in the Convention Parliament. He was re-elected in 1661 for the Cavalier Parliament and sat until his death in 1678. He was created Knight of the Bath in 1661. From 1665 to 1671 he was master of the horse to the Duchess of York and in 1667 was commissioner for regulating the Duke of York's household.

Powle died at the age of 49, and was buried in Shottesbrooke Church.

Powle married by 1673, Anne Crispe daughter of Sir Nicholas Crispe, 1st Baronet of Quex, Kent and had two sons. His brother Henry Powle was Speaker of the House of Commons of England from January 1689 to February 1689.

Parliament of England
Preceded by Henry Marten	Member of Parliament for Berkshire; 1660–1678; With: Sir Robert Pye 1660; Hon. John Lovelace 1661–1670; Richard Neville 1670–1677; Sir Humphrey Forster, 2nd Baronet 1677–1678	Succeeded by Sir Humphrey Forster, 2nd Baronet; The Earl of Stirling
