= Custos Rotulorum of Bedfordshire =

Custos Rotulorum

This is a list of people who have served as Custos Rotulorum of Bedfordshire. Since 1711, the function of Custos Rotulorum has been carried out by the Lords Lieutenant of the county.

- John Mordaunt, 1st Baron Mordaunt bef. 1544 – aft. 1547
- Oliver St John, 1st Baron St John of Bletso bef. 1558 – 1582
- John St John, 2nd Baron St John of Bletso bef. 1584 – 1596
- Oliver St John, 3rd Baron St John of Bletso 1596–1618
- Thomas Wentworth, 1st Earl of Cleveland 1618–1667
- Oliver St John, 2nd Earl of Bolingbroke 1667–1681 jointly with
- Robert Bruce, 1st Earl of Ailesbury 1671–1685
- Thomas Bruce, 2nd Earl of Ailesbury 1685–1689
- Paulet St John, 3rd Earl of Bolingbroke 1689–1711

For later custodes rotulorum, see Lord Lieutenant of Bedfordshire.
