= Sir John Rogers, 3rd Baronet =

British lawyer and politician

High Sheriff of Devon
- In office 1749; 1755

Mayor of Plymouth
- In office 1728-1729; 1743–1744

Member of Parliament for Plymouth
- In office 1739–1740

Personal details
- Born: 31 August 1708 England
- Died: 20 December 1773 (aged 65) Blachford, Devon, England
- Spouse: Hannah Trefusis (m. 1742)
- Parent: John Rogers (father)
- Relatives: John Rogers (grandfather)
- Education: New College, Oxford

Sir John Rogers, 3rd Baronet (31 August 1708 – 20 December 1773) was a British lawyer and politician.

== Early life ==
Baptised in Cornwood, he was the oldest son of Sir John Rogers, 2nd Baronet and his wife Mary Henley, daughter of Sir Robert Henley. Rogers was educated at New College, Oxford, where he matriculated in 1724 and graduated with a Bachelor of Arts two years later. He was then Mayor of Plymouth for 1728-29 and 1743–44 and Recorder of Plymouth (in 1744?). In 1744, he succeeded his father as baronet.

== Career ==
Rogers entered the British House of Commons as member of parliament (MP) for Plymouth in 1739, representing the constituency until the next year, when he was unseated. He served as colonel of the South Devon Militia and was High Sheriff of Devon in 1749 and in 1755.

== Family ==
On 28 October 1742, he married Hannah Trefusis, daughter of Thomas Trefusis at St Benet Paul's Wharf in London. Rogers died of a stroke at his seat in Blachford in Devon and was buried in Cornwood four days later. He had no children and his younger brother Frederick succeeded to the baronetcy.

Parliament of Great Britain
Preceded by Robert Byng; Arthur Stert	Member of Parliament for Plymouth; 1739–1740; With: Robert Byng	Succeeded by Arthur Stert; Charles Vanbrugh
Baronetage of England
Preceded by John Rogers	Baronet (of Wisdome); 1744–1773	Succeeded by Frederick Rogers
