= Charles Vanbrugh =

Charles Vanbrugh (c. 1680 – 2 November 1740) was an officer of the Royal Navy and member of parliament for Plymouth.

Born in Chester, Charles Vanbrugh was baptised at Holy Trinity, Chester on 27 February 1679/1680. In June 1721 he married Ann Burt of Knightsbridge. They had three or more children but only one recorded surviving son, Edward Vanbrugh (1722 – 1802).

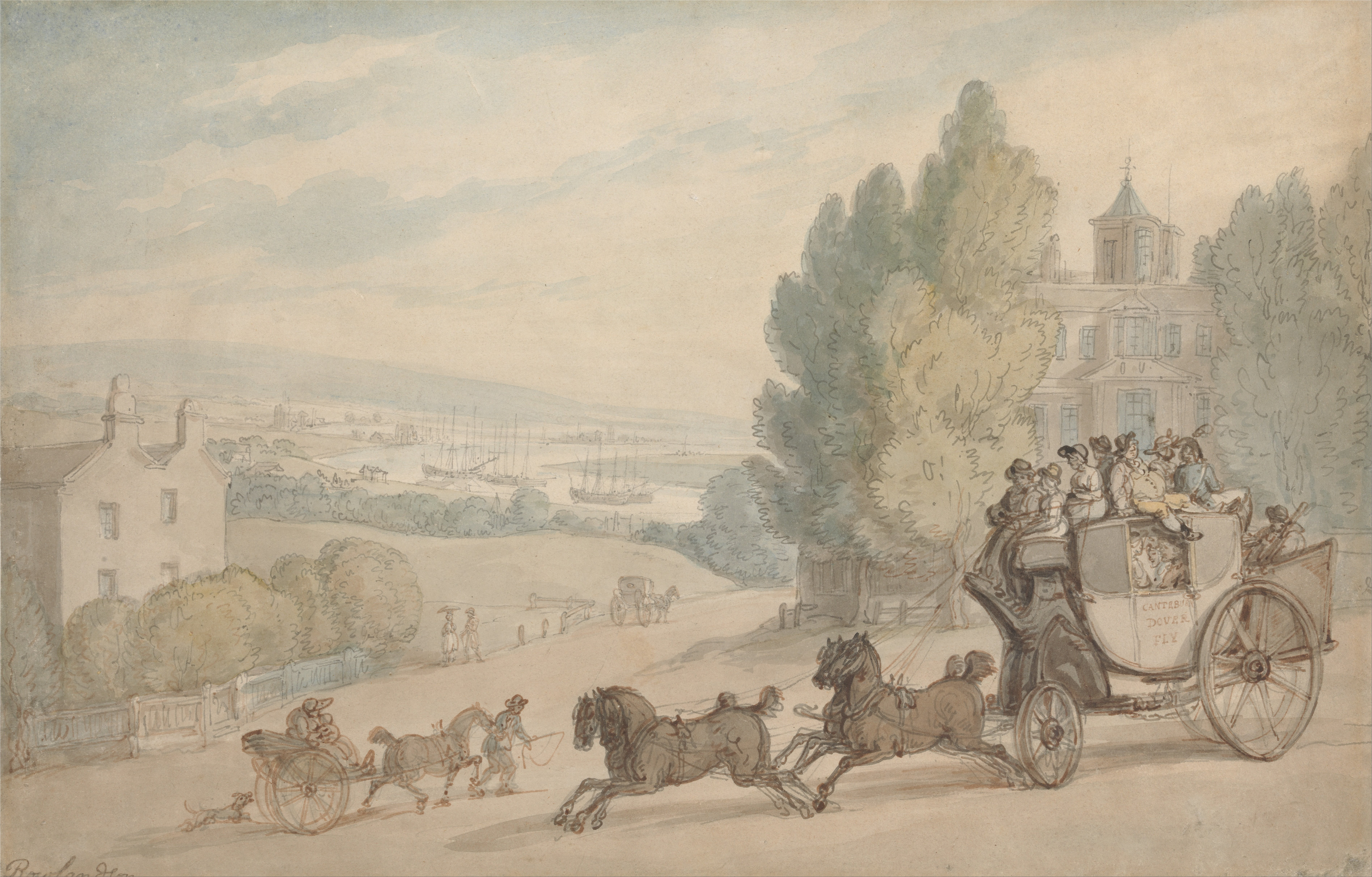
Thomas Rowlandson. The Canterbury coach passing Vanbrugh castle

On 21 February 1708 he was appointed captain of HMS Feversham. Vanbrugh was aged 28. In 1709 he was replaced by Captain Robert Paston under whose command the Feversham was shipwrecked on 7 October 1711 with the loss of 102 lives. Feversham was on a voyage from the Gulf of St. Lawrence to New York City after participating in Admiral Hovenden Walker's disastrous expedition to Quebec.

Charles was the elder of the two youngest brothers to the dramatist and architect John Vanbrugh. Their mother had a daughter by a previous marriage then 19 children (10 more daughters) by Giles Vanbrugh. The youngest brother, Philip, was also in the Royal Navy.

John Vanbrugh built Charles a house beside his "castle" in Greenwich and it was known as the Mince-Pie House (demolished 1902). John's house in Whitehall had been known as The Goose-Pie House. Philip's Greenwich house nearby was known as The Nunnery (demolished 1911).

== Parliament ==
Vanbrugh stood at a by-election for the Plymouth seat in 1739 representing the Admiralty interest. There was a dispute as to which Plymouth persons were eligible to vote for members of parliament. Unsuccessful in the election he petitioned the House of Commons regarding the eligibility of the seat's voters and eventually replaced the elected candidate by Order of the House 17 January 1739 – 1740.

However Vanbrugh died in November the same year and was buried in the Vanbrugh family vault a week later 9 November 1740. Ann his wife died less than 1 months after and, aged 40, was buried there 25 September 1749.

Parliament of Great Britain
Preceded by Arthur Stert and John Rogers	Member of Parliament for Plymouth; 1739–1740; With: Arthur Stert	Succeeded by Lord Henry Beauclerk and Arthur Stert
