= Lord Henry Beauclerk =

Member of Parliament for Plymouth
- In office 1740–1741

Member of Parliament for Thetford
- In office 1741–1761

Personal details
- Born: 11 August 1701
- Died: 6 January 1761 (aged 59)
- Spouse: Martha Lovelace (m. 1739–1761)
- Children: 8

Military service
- Allegiance: Great Britain
- Branch/service: British Army
- Years of service: 1717–1749
- Rank: Colonel
- Unit: 1st Foot Guards
- Battles/wars: Anglo-Spanish War; Thirteenth siege of Gibraltar

Colonel Lord Henry Beauclerk (11 August 1701 – 6 January 1761) was a British Army officer and Whig politician.

Beauclerk was the fourth son of Charles Beauclerk, 1st Duke of St Albans and Diana Beauclerk, Duchess of St Albans. On 12 October 1717, he was given a commission as an ensign in the 31st Regiment of Foot. He fought with the regiment in the Thirteenth siege of Gibraltar in 1727, and in October of that year he was made a captain in the 3rd Regiment of Foot. In May 1735 he transferred to the 1st Foot Guards as a lieutenant colonel.

In 1740, Beauclerk was elected as a Member of Parliament for Plymouth as a supporter of the administration of Robert Walpole. The following year, he was returned as a member for Thetford under the patronage of his cousin, Charles FitzRoy, 2nd Duke of Grafton. He continued to represent the seat until his death in 1761.

From 1743 to 1745, Beauclerk was colonel of the 48th Regiment of Foot. Between 1745 and 1749, he was colonel of the 31st Regiment of Foot. In 1749 he sold his command as the Duke of Cumberland refused to allow him more than two months’ leave from the army. The refusal stemmed from Beauclerk's refusal to alter his vote at a court martial in 1745 which had acquitted someone who Cumberland had wished to see condemned.

On 24 June 1739, he married the courtier, Martha Lovelace, daughter of John Lovelace, 4th Baron Lovelace. Together they had eight children.

Parliament of Great Britain
Preceded by Arthur Stert; Charles Vanbrugh	Member of Parliament for Plymouth; 1740–1741; With: Arthur Stert	Succeeded by Arthur Stert; Lord Vere Beauclerk
Preceded by Lord Augustus FitzRoy; Charles FitzRoy-Scudamore	Member of Parliament for Thetford; 1741–1761; With: Charles FitzRoy-Scudamore (1741–1754); Herbert Westfaling (1754–1761)	Succeeded by Henry Seymour Conway; Hon. Aubrey Beauclerk
