= Arthur Stert =

Arthur Stert (died 1755) of Membland, near Modbury, Devon was a British landowner and Whig politician who sat in the House of Commons from 1727 to 1754.

Stert's family had been settled near Plympton, Devon, and in 1723 he purchased the estate of Membland from the Champernowne family. He rebuilt the house with detached wings.

Stert had a small electoral interest at Plymouth with the corporation. He was returned unopposed as Member of Parliament for Plymouth at the 1727 British general election as a government supporter. In 1730 he was appointed a commissioner for settling the claims of merchants against Spain under the Treaty of Seville. He was responsible for assessing the compensation payable to them, and was examined on them by the House of Commons. He was returned again for Plymouth in 1734 and 1741. He lost his post after the fall of Walpole in 1742 but was recommended by Walpole to Pelham who obtained a secret service pension for him and used him in west country elections. He was returned unopposed again at the 1747 British general election but did not stand in 1754.

Stert died on 2 February 1755. He married but was predeceased by his only son, leaving two daughters.

Parliament of Great Britain
Preceded by William Chetwynd; Hon. Pattee Byng	Member of Parliament for Plymouth; 1727–1754; With: George Treby 1727-1728; Robert Byng 1728-1739; John Rogers 1739-1740; Captain Charles Vanbrugh 1740; Lord Henry Beauclerk 1740-1741; Admiral Lord Vere Beauclerk 1741-1750; Captain Charles Saunders 1750-1754	Succeeded by The Viscount Barrington; Samuel Dicker
