= Martha Johnson, 8th Baroness Wentworth =

English baroness

The Right Honourable The Baroness Wentworth
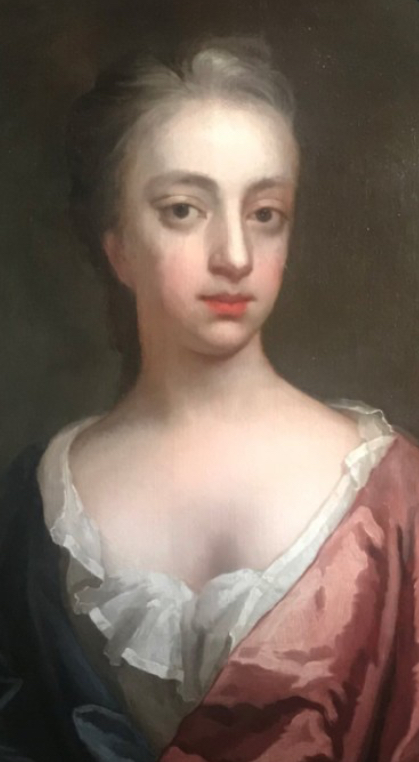
- Martha Johnson's wedding portrait

Personal details
- Born: Martha Lovelace; 1667
- Died: 1745 (aged 77–78)
- Spouse(s): Henry Johnson, MP
- Parent(s): John Lovelace, 3rd Baron Lovelace; Martha Pye

Martha Johnson, 8th Baroness Wentworth (1667–1745), was an English baroness. She was the only surviving child of John Lovelace, 3rd Baron Lovelace. His title passed to a male heir on his death but Martha later inherited the title of Baroness Wentworth from her grandmother, Anne Lovelace, 7th Baroness Wentworth, in 1697 (though the claim was not proven until 1702). In 1692, she married Henry Johnson, MP. They had no children and upon her death in 1745, her title passed to a distant cousin.

Peerage of England
| Preceded by Anne Lovelace | Baroness Wentworth; 1697–1745 | Succeeded by Edward Noel |
