= Thomas Wentworth, 5th Baron Wentworth =

English landowner and soldier (1612–1665)

The Right Honourable The Lord Wentworth KB, PC

Member of Parliament for Bedfordshire
- In office April 1640 – November 1640

Personal details
- Born: 2 February 1612 (baptised) Toddington, Bedfordshire
- Died: 1 March 1665 (aged 52–53) Toddington, Bedfordshire
- Resting place: Church of St George, Toddington, Bedfordshire
- Spouse: Philadelphia Carey (1658–his death)
- Children: Henrietta Maria (1660–1686)
- Parent(s): Thomas Wentworth, 1st Earl of Cleveland (1591–1667); Anne Crofts (died 1638)

Military service
- Rank: Major-General
- Battles/wars: Wars of the Three Kingdoms; Storming of Cirencester; Chalgrove Field; Tipton Green; Copredy Bridge; 2nd Newbury; Lostwithiel; Torrington; Worcester; Franco-Spanish War (1635–1659); Battle of the Dunes

Thomas Wentworth, 5th Baron Wentworth, KB, PC (bap. 2 February 1612 – 1 March 1665) was an English landowner and soldier who supported the Royalists during the Wars of the Three Kingdoms. At the end of the First English Civil War in 1646, he accompanied the future Charles II of England into exile and fought with him at the Battle of Worcester in 1651.

== Private life ==
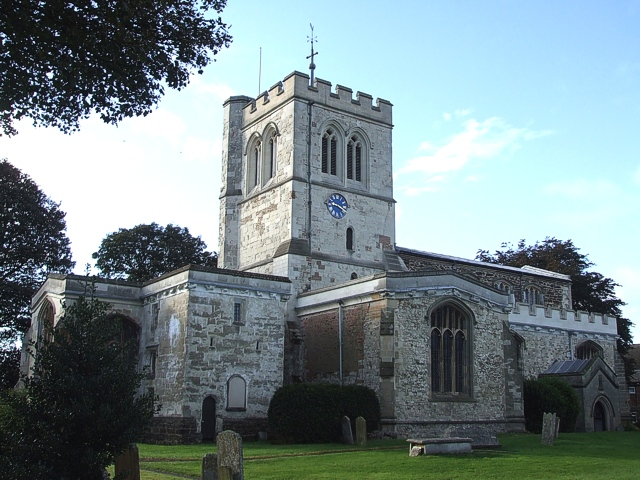
Church of St George, Toddington, Bedfordshire, where Wentworth was buried in 1665

Wentworth was born in 1612, the eldest son of the 1st Earl of Cleveland and his first wife, Anne Crofts (died 1638). His exact birthdate is unknown, but parish records show that he was baptised on 2 February 1612.

In 1640, he was elected member of parliament (MP) for Bedfordshire to the Short Parliament in April and again to the Long Parliament in November. However, before he took his seat in November, he was called up to the House of Lords by writ of acceleration in his father's barony of Wentworth.

He was married by mid-March 1658 to Philadelphia Carey (died 1696), daughter of Sir Ferdinando Carey (1590–1638), granddaughter of Sir Edmund Carey (1558–1637). Together they had one child: Henrietta Maria Wentworth, who was born on 11 August 1660.

Honours awarded to Wentworth included being created a Knight of the Bath and appointment to the Privy Council of England (PC).

Wentworth died at age 53 on 1 March 1665, thereby predeceasing his father by two years. He was buried six days later at Toddington. His daughter, Henrietta, succeeded to the barony upon her father's death; she would have an affair with James Scott, 1st Duke of Monmouth, but no children. After her death at 25, the barony passed to her aunt, Anne Lovelace, 7th Baroness Wentworth, the wife of John Lovelace, 2nd Baron Lovelace.

== The Civil War ==
During the First English Civil War, Wentworth was the Sergeant-Major-General of Horse and commanded the Prince of Wales's Regiment of Horse. He saw action at Tipton Green, Cropredy Bridge, and possibly at Newbury, all in 1644; at Langport in 1645; and at Worcester, the final battle of the English Civil War in 1651. He fought most battles alongside his father. When the Royalists were defeated, Lord Wentworth accompanied the court into exile. He raised a regiment (which later became the Grenadier Guards) at Bruges as a bodyguard to the exiled Charles II.

=== Prelude: the Bishops' Wars ===
From 1639 to 1640, Wentworth fought against the Scots in the Bishops' Wars.

=== First English Civil War ===
At the outset of the civil war in 1642, Wentworth was with George Goring in Portsmouth. After the fall of that garrison, he joined the King's Main Field Army, and as Lord Wentworth, raised a company of dragoons. He fought at Marlborough, Wiltshire, in December 1642, and at Cirencester, Gloucestershire, in February 1643.

On 2 February 1643, he became major-general of dragoons, in succession to Sir Arthur Aston. In the early part of the civil war, dragoons formed a substantial part of the mounted arm, although they were merely infantrymen set on ponies and other small horses initially regarded as unsuitable for cavalry troopers. As the war progressed, however, standards dropped and all riding horses went to the cavalry, irrespective of size or condition. This caused the dragoons to dwindle in both numbers and importance. All too often they simply discarded their muskets and started calling themselves troopers.

Consequently, Wentworth followed suit and on 5 February 1644, he succeeded Sir Thomas Byron as colonel of the Prince of Wales's Regiment of Horse. At the Battle of Cropredy Bridge (June 1644) he commanded a cavalry brigade. He was afterward appointed major-general of horse in succession to Lord Wilmot, when the latter was dismissed before the battle of Lostwithiel. However, on 14 November 1644, he relinquished this post in order to join Lord Goring's army in the west country.

After Goring's defeat at Langport and subsequent dismissal, Wentworth was appointed major-general of horse under the western army's new commander, Lord Hopton. Unfortunately Hopton was soon on bad terms with Wentworth and contrived to get himself badly beaten at Torrington on 14 March 1646. As a result, the already demoralized western army surrendered soon afterwards.

=== Exile with Prince Charles ===
Wentworth escaped with Prince Charles in the spring of 1646. The prince's court went first to the Isles of Scilly and then to Jersey.

In 1649, Wentworth accompanied Charles to Paris.

=== Third English Civil War ===
The following year both Wentworth and his father, the earl of Cleveland, sailed with Charles to Scotland. Charles was compelled to subscribe to the Solemn League and Covenant as a condition of being recognised as King, but many of his followers neglected to do so including Wentworth and his father. Despite the defeat of the Scots army at Dunbar on 3 September 1650, both Wentworth and his father were, as non-subscribers, ordered out of the country on 17 October. Just as with the Earl of Forth and other prominent royalists, they ignored this edict and subsequently fought at Worcester on 3 September 1651. Although his father was afterwards captured, Wentworth got away safely.

=== Exile with King Charles ===
Until the Restoration in 1660, Wentworth attended Charles II's émigré court.

In 1656 in Bruges, he was responsible for organizing and commanding a regiment of foot guards that served as a bodyguard unit to the exiled king. The regiment also served with the Spanish army at the Battle of the Dunes in June 1658, although there is some doubt as to whether Wentworth personally fought there.

=== Restoration ===
After the 1660 Stuart Restoration Wentworth returned home to England. He brought the regiment of foot guards with him, where it became the 1st foot guards and afterwards the Grenadier Guards.

== See also ==
- Cavalier
- Horses in warfare

Parliament of England
Parliament suspended since 1629	Member of Parliament for Bedfordshire; 1640; With: Sir Oliver Luke	Succeeded by Roger Burgoyne; Sir Oliver Luke
Peerage of England
Preceded by Thomas Wentworth	Baron Wentworth (writ of acceleration); 1640–1665	Succeeded by Thomas Wentworth
Military offices
Preceded by Henry Wilmot, 1st Earl of Rochester	Colonel of Lord Wentworth's Regiment; 1656–1660	Succeeded by Hon. John Russell
