= Richard Ingoldesby =

British army officer and colonial administrator

Acting Governor of the Province of New York
- In office 1691–1692
- Monarchs: William III & Mary II
- Preceded by: Henry Sloughter
- Succeeded by: Benjamin Fletcher

Lieutenant governor of New Jersey
- In office November 1702 – April 1710
- Monarch: Anne
- Governor: Viscount Cornbury, John Lovelace, 4th Baron Lovelace
- Preceded by: Office created
- Succeeded by: Office abolished

Lieutenant governor of New York
- In office November 1702 – April 1710
- Monarch: Anne
- Governor: Viscount Cornbury, John Lovelace, 4th Baron Lovelace
- Preceded by: John Nanfan
- Succeeded by: Gerardus Beekman

Acting Governor of New Jersey and New York
- In office May 1709 – April 1710
- Monarch: Anne
- Preceded by: John Lovelace, 4th Baron Lovelace
- Succeeded by: Robert Hunter

Personal details
- Died: 1 March 1719 New York City
- Profession: Army officer; colonial administrator

Richard Ingoldesby (died 1 March 1719) was a British army officer and colonial administrator who served as the lieutenant governor of both New Jersey and New York. He became the acting governor for the two colonies from May 1709 to April 1710.

== Life ==
Ingoldesby served William, Prince of Orange during the Glorious Revolution as a field officer. During the Williamite War in Ireland, he besieged the Jacobite stronghold of Carrickfergus. Ingoldesby, in September 1690, became a captain of a company being sent to New York to restore the royal crown following Leisler's Rebellion. Ingoldesby did this by removing Jacob Leisler from his assumed position as lieutenant governor of New York, and forced Leisler to surrender New York City. Following a brief skirmish in March 1691, Leisler was tried and convicted for both murder and treason, and was hanged that May on orders from Governor Henry Sloughter. This provoked some distaste by the pro-Leislerian followers.

The New York Council proceeded to select Ingoldesby as the commander-in-chief of the colony until a successor for Sloughter, who died not long after the Leisler trial, could be appointed. Ingoldesby then held the position of governor from the summer of 1691 until August 1692, when Benjamin Fletcher was commissioned. Ingoldesby entered into a formal treaty of alliance and friendship with the Iroquois on 6 June 1692, in the midst of a conflict known as King William's War.

Fletcher was dispatched to a company in Albany, New York, but low payment and supplies prompted him to return to England in 1696 for seven years (instead of his one-year furlough). Through political intrigue, he attempted to get promoted, and was acquainted with William Dockwra, one of several East Jersey proprietors. Ingoldesby was backed by Dockwra to become the first royal governor of New Jersey, but Edward Hyde, Lord Cornbury became governor instead and Ingoldesby became the lieutenant. Cornbury refused to grant any power to Ingoldesby at all during his period of governorship. Instead, Ingoldesby became part of the New Jersey Provincial Council.

Following the death of John Lovelace on 6 May 1709, he became the acting governor of both New Jersey and New York. However, due to the efforts of the proprietors that he opposed, Ingoldesby's governorship became an object of suspicion.

In part of the "Glorious Enterprise", a joint invasion of Canada by American and British forces, Ingoldesby urged the Assembly to raise New Jersey's quota of 200 men, a move which was unpopular with the Assembly's Quaker minority. However, he later twisted his role and tried to remove the Quakers from holding office positions by defeating the bill, whereupon he ordered that all Quakers were excluded from all public offices. Ultimately, he was persuaded to raise and equip the men, but since the British failed to provide any support, the mission was unsuccessful. Realizing that he would never become the appointed governor of New Jersey, Ingoldesby instead tried to divert much of the money that was to go to Lovelace to himself.

His commission for governorship was revoked by October 1709, but the news only reached him in April 1710. He died in New York on 1 March 1719.

== See also ==
- List of colonial governors of New Jersey
- List of colonial governors of New York

Government offices
Preceded by Henry Sloughter	Governor of the Province of New York (acting); 1691–1692	Succeeded by Benjamin Fletcher
Preceded by John Lovelace	Acting Governor of the Provinces of New Jersey and New York; 1709–1710	Succeeded by Robert Hunter
