= Baron Wentworth =

Barony in the Peerage of England

- Wentworth arms: Sable, a chevron between three leopard's faces, or
- Creation date: 2 December 1529
- Created by: King Henry VIII
- Peerage: England
- First holder: Thomas Wentworth, 6th Baron le Despencer
- Present holder: John Lytton, 5th Earl of Lytton, 18th Baron Wentworth
- Heir apparent: Philip Lytton, Viscount Knebworth
- Remainder to: 1st Baron's heirs general of the body lawfully begotten
- Seat: Knebworth House
- Former seats: Wentworth Woodhouse; Nettlestead Place; Wentworth Castle
- Motto: Pensez à bien ("Think of good")

Baron Wentworth is a title in the Peerage of England. It was created in 1529 for Thomas Wentworth, who was also de jure sixth Baron le Despencer of the 1387 creation. The title was created by writ, which means that it can descend via female lines (according to the male-preference cognatic primogeniture).

== History ==
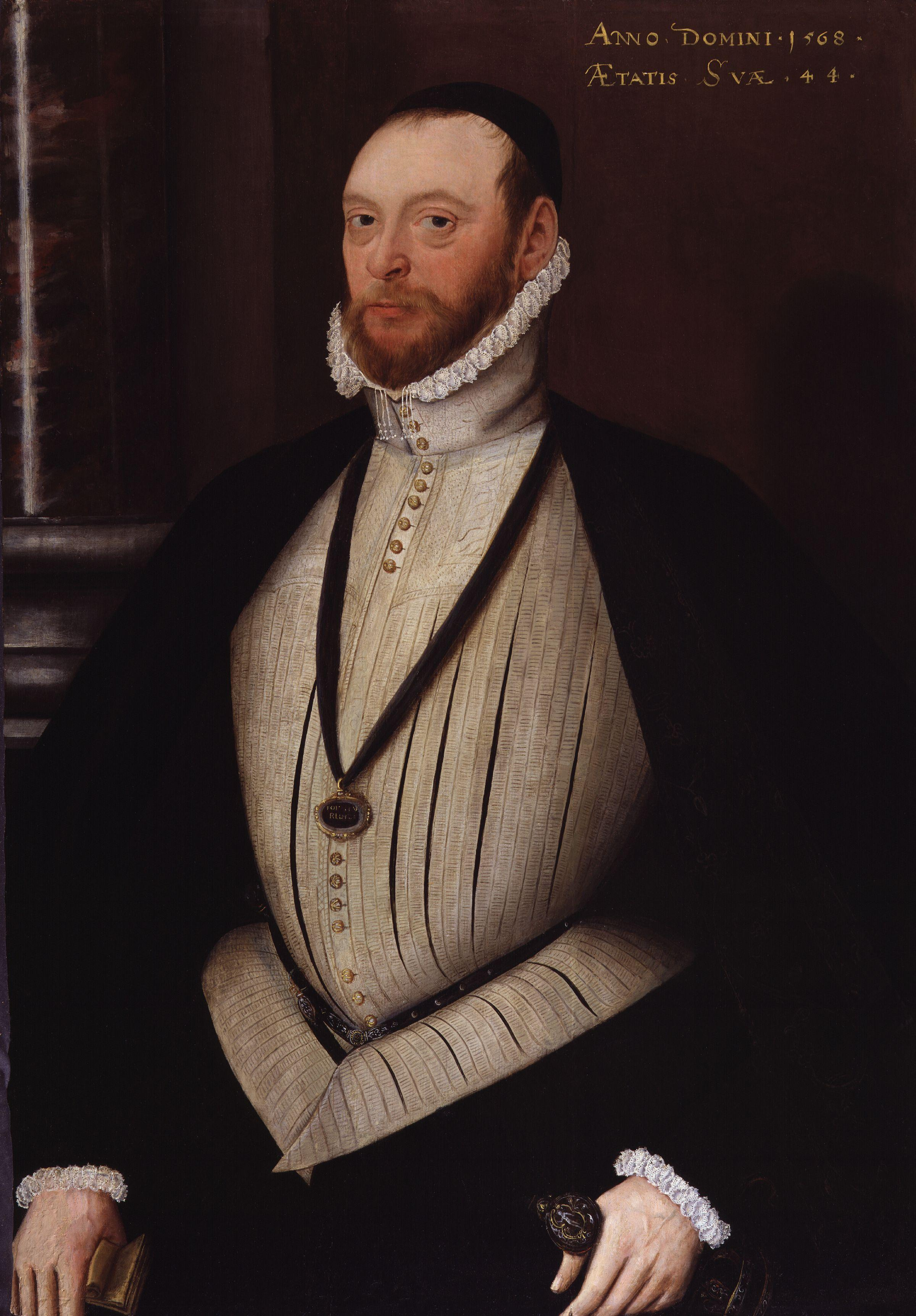
Thomas Wentworth, 2nd Baron Wentworth

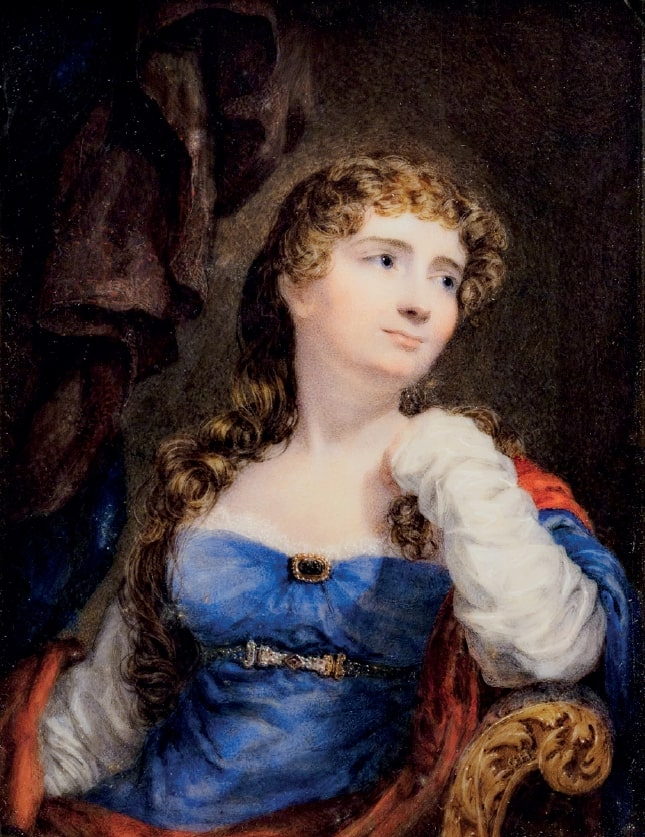
Anne Byron, 11th Baroness Wentworth

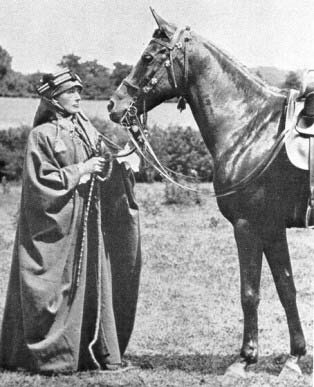
Anne Blunt, 15th Baroness Wentworth, in Bedouin dress, with her favourite riding mare, Kasida Date

=== Wentworth family ===
Thomas Wentworth was created Baron Wentworth in 1529.

He was succeeded by his son, also named Thomas Wentworth. The second Baron represented Suffolk in the House of Commons and served as Deputy of Calais.

His grandson, Thomas Wentworth, the fourth Baron, was created Earl of Cleveland in the Peerage of England in 1626. He later became a prominent Royalist commander in the Civil War. The earldom became extinct on Lord Cleveland's death in 1667.

His son Thomas Wentworth was summoned to the House of Lords through a writ of acceleration in 1640 in his father's junior title of Baron Wentworth (and is considered the fifth Baron). He was also a noted Royalist commander in the Civil War. However, he predeceased his father by two years.

Henrietta Maria Wentworth, daughter of the fifth Baron, succeeded as the sixth holder upon her grandfather's death. She was the mistress of the Duke of Monmouth, helping to finance his unsuccessful rebellion in 1685. She died without issue the following year.

=== Lovelace and Johnson families ===
The 6th Baroness died aged 25 and was succeeded by her aunt Anne, the seventh holder. She was the wife of John Lovelace, 2nd Baron Lovelace. On her death in 1697, the title passed to her granddaughter Martha Johnson, the eighth holder. However, it was not until 1702 that she was confirmed in the title.

=== Noel family ===
The 8th Baroness was succeeded by her kinsman Sir Edward Noel, 6th Baronet, of Kirkby Mallory, who became the ninth Baron (see Noel baronets for earlier history of this title). He was the heir of the Hon. Margaret Noel, daughter of the 7th Baroness. In 1762 he was created Viscount Wentworth, of Wellesborough in the County of Leicester, in the Peerage of Great Britain. He was succeeded by his son, the 2nd Viscount. He briefly represented Leicestershire in Parliament before he succeeded his father in the viscountcy. Lord Wentworth had no legitimate male heir and on his death in 1815 the viscountcy and baronetcy became extinct. The barony fell into abeyance.

The abeyance was terminated in 1856 in favour of Anne Isabella Byron, Dowager Baroness Byron, who became the eleventh holder of the title. She was the daughter of the Hon. Judith Noel, daughter of the first Viscount Wentworth, and her husband Sir Ralph Milbanke, 6th Baronet, of Halbany, and the widow of the famous poet George Gordon Byron, 6th Baron Byron. Lord and Lady Byron had in 1822 assumed by Royal licence the surname of Noel. However, she never used the substantive title of Lady Wentworth in the four years between her accession and her death in 1860; she continued to be known as Lady Byron.

=== King-Noel family ===
She was succeeded by her grandson Byron King-Noel, Viscount Ockham, who became the twelfth Baron. He was the eldest son of Ada King, Countess of Lovelace, daughter of Lord and Lady Byron, and her husband William King-Noel, 1st Earl of Lovelace. However, he never married and on his early death in 1862 at the age of 26, the barony was passed on to his younger brother, Ralph King-Milbanke. In 1893, he succeeded his father as second Earl of Lovelace. When he died in 1906, the earldom and barony separated. He was succeeded in the earldom by his half-brother, the third Earl, while the barony was inherited by his daughter and only child Lady Ada King-Milbanke, the fourteenth holder.

=== Blunt and Lytton families ===
Arms of the Earls of Lytton, holders of the title of Baron Wentworth since 1957.

The 14th Baroness never married and was succeeded by her aunt, Lady Anne Blunt, the fifteenth holder of the peerage. She was the wife of the poet Wilfrid Scawen Blunt. She was succeeded by her only surviving child, Judith, the sixteenth holder. She married the Hon. Neville Bulwer-Lytton, youngest son of Robert Bulwer-Lytton, 1st Earl of Lytton. In 1947 he succeeded his elder brother as third Earl of Lytton. Lord Lytton and Lady Wentworth were succeeded respectively in 1951 and 1957 by their son Noel Lytton, 4th Earl of Lytton; as a consequence the barony became subsidiary to the Earldom of Lytton from 1957. As of 2017 the titles are held by the latter's eldest son, John Lytton, 5th Earl of Lytton.

== Barons Wentworth (1529) ==
- Thomas Wentworth, 1st Baron Wentworth (1501–1551)
- Thomas Wentworth, 2nd Baron Wentworth (1525–1584)
- Henry Wentworth, 3rd Baron Wentworth (1558–1593)
- Thomas Wentworth, 4th Baron Wentworth (1591–1667) (created Earl of Cleveland in 1626)

=== Earls of Cleveland (1626) ===
- Thomas Wentworth, 1st Earl of Cleveland, 4th Baron Wentworth (1591–1667)

=== Barons Wentworth (1529; reverted) ===
- Thomas Wentworth, 5th Baron Wentworth (1612–1665) (by writ of acceleration)
- Henrietta Wentworth, 6th Baroness Wentworth (1660–1686)
- Anne Lovelace, 7th Baroness Wentworth (1623–1697)
- Martha Johnson, 8th Baroness Wentworth (1667–1745)
- Edward Noel, 9th Baron Wentworth (1715–1774) (created Viscount Wentworth in 1762)

=== Barons Wentworth (1628) ===
The title Baron Wentworth, of Wentworth-Woodhouse, Baron of Newmarch and Oversley, was created in 1628 in the Peerage of England for Sir Thomas Wentworth, 2nd Baronet of Wentworth Woodhouse in the County of York. The following year, in 1629, he was further advanced in the peerage to become Viscount Wentworth. In January 1640, this Lord Wentworth was created Earl of Strafford and Baron Raby. He served as Lord Deputy of Ireland from 1632 until 1640.

- Thomas Wentworth, 1st Earl of Strafford, 1st Viscount Wentworth, 1st Baron Wentworth and 1st Baron Raby (1593–1641)
- William Wentworth, 2nd Earl of Strafford, 2nd Viscount Wentworth, 2nd Baron Wentworth and 2nd Baron Raby (1626–1695)

=== Viscounts Wentworth (1762) ===
- Edward Noel, 1st Viscount Wentworth, 9th Baron Wentworth (1715–1774)
- Thomas Noel, 2nd Viscount Wentworth, 10th Baron Wentworth (1745–1815) (viscountcy extinct; barony abeyant)

=== Barons Wentworth (1529; reverted) ===
- Anne Isabella Noel Byron, 11th Baroness Wentworth and Baroness Byron (1792–1860) (abeyance terminated 1856)
- Byron King-Noel, 12th Baron Wentworth (1836–1862)
- Ralph Gordon King-Milbanke, 2nd Earl of Lovelace, 13th Baron Wentworth (1839–1906)
- Ada Mary King-Milbanke, 14th Baroness Wentworth (1871–1917)
- Anne Isabella Noel Blunt, 15th Baroness Wentworth (1837–1917)
- Judith Anne Dorothea Blunt-Lytton, 16th Baroness Wentworth (1873–1957)
- Noel Anthony Scawen Lytton, 4th Earl of Lytton, 17th Baron Wentworth (1900–1985) (barony subsidiary to the earldom of Lytton since 1957)
- John Peter Michael Scawen Lytton, 5th Earl of Lytton, 18th Baron Wentworth (born 1950)

== Title succession chart ==
Title succession chart

Thomas Wentworth; 1st Baron Wentworth; 1501–1551
Thomas Wentworth; 2nd Baron Wentworth; 1525–1584
Henry Wentworth; 3rd Baron Wentworth; 1558–1593
Earl of Cleveland
Thomas Wentworth; 1st Earl of Cleveland; 4th Baron Wentworth; 1591–1667
Earldom extinct
Thomas Wentworth; 5th Baron Wentworth; 1612–1665	Anne Lovelace; 7th Baroness Wentworth; 1623–1697
Henrietta Wentworth; 6th Baroness Wentworth; 1660–1686	John Lovelace; 3rd Baron Lovelace c. 1640 – 1693	Hon. Margaret Noel c. 1644 – 1671
Martha Johnson; 8th Baroness Wentworth; 1667–1745	Sir John Noel; 4th Baronet; 1668–1697
Sir Clobery Noel; 5th Baronet; 1695–1733
Viscount Wentworth
Edward Noel; 1st Viscount Wentworth; 9th Baron Wentworth; 1715–1774
Thomas Noel; 2nd Viscount Wentworth; 10th Baron Wentworth; 1745–1815	Hon. Judith Noel; 1751–1825
Viscountcy extinct
Anne Noel-Byron; 11th Baroness Wentworth; 1792–1860
Ada King; Countess of Lovelace; 1815–1852
Byron King-Noel; 12th Baron Wentworth; 1836–1862	Ralph King-Milbanke; 2nd Earl of Lovelace; 13th Baron Wentworth; 1839–1906	Anne Blunt; 15th Baroness Wentworth; 1837–1917
Ada King-Milbanke; 14th Baroness Wentworth; 1871–1917	Judith Blunt-Lytton; 16th Baroness Wentworth; 1873–1957
Noel Lytton; 4th Earl of Lytton; 17th Baron Wentworth; 1900–1985
John Lytton; 5th Earl of Lytton; 18th Baron Wentworth born 1950

== See also ==
- Baron le Despencer
- Baron Lovelace
- Earl of Lovelace
- Earl of Lytton
