= Henrietta Wentworth, 6th Baroness Wentworth =

English peeress

The Right Honourable The Lady Wentworth
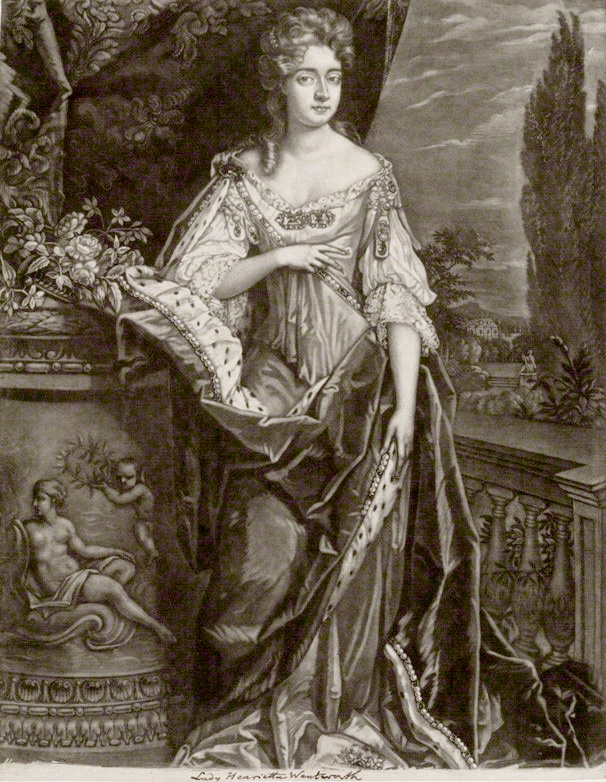
- Henrietta Wentworth, 6th Baroness Wentworth

Personal details
- Born: Hon. Henrietta Maria Wentworth; 11 August 1660
- Died: 23 April 1686 (aged 25)
- Resting place: Toddington Church, Toddington, Bedfordshire
- Parents: Thomas Wentworth, 5th Baron Wentworth; Philadelphia Carey
- Occupation: Peer

Henrietta Maria Wentworth, 6th Baroness Wentworth (11 August 1660 – 23 April 1686) was an English peeress. She was the mistress of James Scott, 1st Duke of Monmouth, and she financed the Monmouth Rebellion led by her lover. She survived his execution in 1685, but she died the following year at the age of 25.

== Family and early life ==
Henrietta Maria Wentworth was born as the only child of Thomas Wentworth, 5th Baron Wentworth, and his wife, Philadelphia Carey. Henrietta spent her early years at the family home, Toddington Manor, Bedfordshire. When her father died in 1665, she became heir apparent to her grandfather, Thomas Wentworth, 1st Earl of Cleveland. On his death two years later, she inherited the barony of Wentworth.

== Scandalous relationship with the Duke of Monmouth ==
In 1680 she became involved in scandal. Lady Wentworth was set to marry Richard Tufton, 5th Earl of Thanet, but James Scott, 1st Duke of Monmouth, proposed himself instead although he was already married. Lady Wentworth's mother swiftly brought her back to Toddington, but Monmouth followed her there and moved in with her.

When Monmouth was implicated in the 1683 Rye House Plot to kill King Charles II (Monmouth's illegitimate father) and the king's brother, Lady Wentworth joined him in exile to Holland and was received by the Prince of Orange as Monmouth's mistress. When Monmouth's uncle James II acceded to the English throne in 1685, the duke launched a rebellion that was financed in part by Lady Wentworth's jewellery. After the short-lived rebellion failed, Monmouth was executed on Tower Hill but without final eucharist as he refused to acknowledge that his relationship with Lady Wentworth had been sinful. A month after the execution, Lady Wentworth returned to England.

== Death and funeral monument ==
Lady Wentworth died the following April, in 1686, at age 25. She was buried at Toddington church and her mother erected a monument to her in the north transept. The barony passed to her aunt, Anne Lovelace, 7th Baroness Wentworth.

== See also ==
- Baron Wentworth

== Notes ==
- Clifton, Robert (2004). "Wentworth, Henrietta Maria, suo jure Baroness Wentworth (1660–1686), royal mistress". Oxford Dictionary of National Biography. Oxford Dictionary of National Biography (online ed.). Oxford University Press. doi:10.1093/ref:odnb/29048. (Subscription, Wikipedia Library access or UK public library membership required.)

Peerage of England
Preceded by Thomas Wentworth	Baroness Wentworth; 1667–1686	Succeeded by Anne Lovelace
