= Neville Lovelace, 6th Baron Lovelace =

British peer (1708–1736)

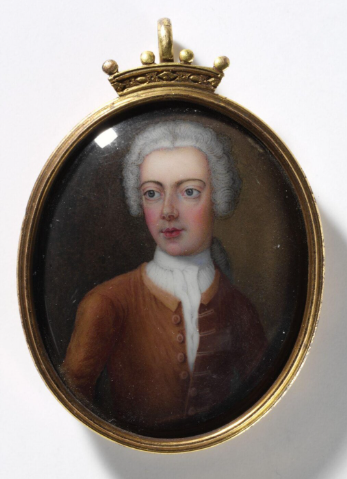
Neville Lovelace

Nevill Lovelace (1708–1736) was the 6th and final Baron Lovelace. The peerage title became extinct upon his death in 1736 because he had no heir. Nevill Lovelace was 1 or 2 years old when he inherited the title of 6th Baron Lovelace in 1709. He died at 28.
