= Thomas Wentworth, 1st Earl of Cleveland =

English landowner and Royalist general

Major-General The Right Honourable The Earl of Cleveland KB
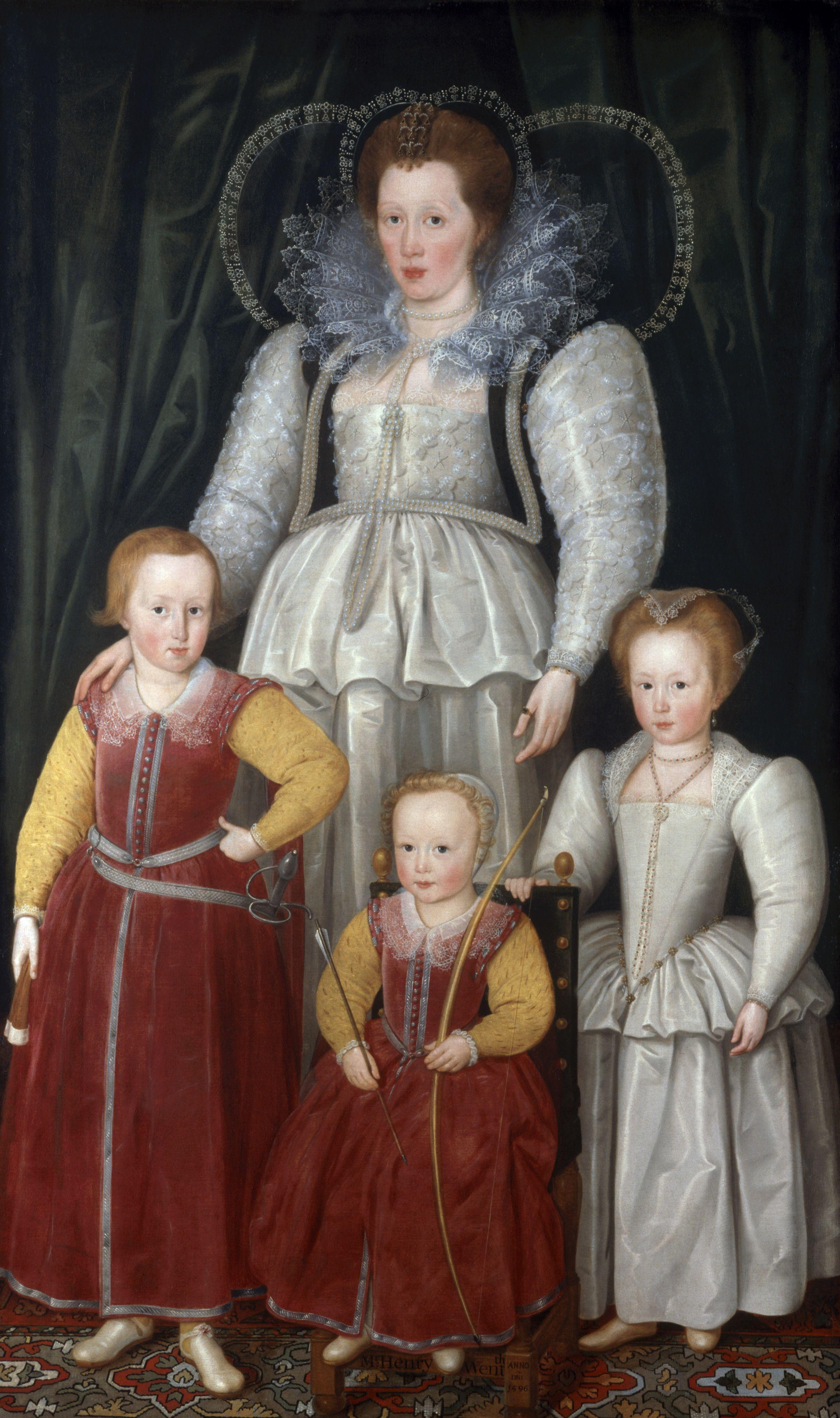
- Wentworth as a child (left), with his mother Anne and siblings Henry (centre) and Jane (right)

Captain of the Gentlemen Pensioners
- In office June 1660 – March 1667

Lord Lieutenant of Bedfordshire
- In office 1625 to 1642 – 1660 to 1667

Custos Rotulorum of Bedfordshire
- In office 1618 to 1642 – 1660 to 1667

Personal details
- Born: 1591 Nettlestead, Suffolk
- Died: 25 March 1667 (aged 75–76) Toddington, Bedfordshire
- Resting place: Church of St George, Toddington, Bedfordshire
- Spouses: Anne Croft (m. 1611; died 1638) Lucy Wentworth (m. 1638; died 1651)
- Relations: Henrietta Wentworth, 6th Baroness Wentworth (granddaughter); John Lovelace, 3rd Baron Lovelace (grandson)
- Children: Thomas Wentworth, 5th Baron Wentworth; Anne Lovelace, 7th Baroness Wentworth; Lady Catherine Spencer
- Parent(s): Henry Wentworth, 3rd Baron Wentworth; Anne Hopton
- Education: Trinity College, Oxford

Military service
- Rank: Major-General
- Battles/wars: Anglo-French War (1627–1629); Siege of Saint-Martin-de-Ré; Wars of the Three Kingdoms; Edgehill; First Newbury (WIA); Cropredy Bridge; 2nd Newbury (POW); Worcester (POW)

Thomas Wentworth, 1st Earl of Cleveland (1591 – 25 March 1667), was an English landowner and Royalist general during the Wars of the Three Kingdoms, described by one historian as a "much under-rated field commander". A distant relative of Thomas Wentworth, 1st Earl of Strafford, executed by Parliament in May 1641, his son Thomas Wentworth, 5th Baron Wentworth, also served in the Royalist army and predeceased him in March 1665.

== Early life ==
Thomas Wentworth was born in 1591 in Nettlestead, Suffolk. He was the eldest son of Henry Wentworth, 3rd Baron Wentworth (1558–1593), who owned an estate near Nettlestead, and his wife Anne Hopton (1561–1625). He had a younger brother, Henry, and sister Jane, as well as a number of half-siblings from his mother's second marriage to William Pope, Earl of Downe.

== Career ==
Wentworth attended Trinity College, Oxford along with his younger brother Henry and was created Knight of the Bath in 1610. He inherited an estate near Toddington, Bedfordshire in 1614, which replaced Nettlesham as his principal residence. At some point in the next few years, he became part of the patronage network associated with George Villiers, 1st Duke of Buckingham, whose personal relationship with both James I and his son Charles I made him extremely powerful. With his support, Wentworth was appointed Custos Rotulorum of Bedfordshire in 1618, then Lord Lieutenant in 1625, while Charles made him Earl of Cleveland in 1626.

He remained close to Buckingham, taking part in the failed attack on Saint-Martin-de-Ré in 1627 and was present when the latter was assassinated in August 1628. Extravagant spending took him into debt and despite mortgaging some of his estates, by 1637 he owed his creditors more than £19,000, an enormous sum for the time. His participation in the 1639 to 1640 Bishops' Wars, during which he raised several troops for the Royalist army, increased these to over £60,000 and he was eventually forced to sell Nettlesham Manor in 1643.

During the trial of his distant kinsman Thomas Wentworth, 1st Earl of Strafford, he appeared as a witness for the defence and was present at his execution in May 1641. He supported Charles I in his struggle with Parliament, joined his army when the First English Civil War began in August 1642 and was almost certainly present at Edgehill in October. Wounded at First Newbury in September 1643, he was later given command of a cavalry brigade in the Oxford field army and at the Battle of Cropredy Bridge in June 1644, led a charge that routed the Parliamentarian horse and captured their artillery.

He subsequently took part in the West Country campaign that culminated in a significant Royalist victory at Lostwithiel in September; the Parliamentarian infantry were forced to surrender but most of their cavalry escaped, despite a vigorous pursuit by Wentworth. At Second Newbury in October, he was captured and held in the Tower of London until 1647, when he was allowed out on bail; after the Execution of Charles I in January 1649, he joined his son Thomas and Charles II in The Hague. At the Battle of Worcester in 1651, he led a series of cavalry charges that bought enough time for Charles to make his escape.

=== Later life ===
Captured in Shropshire two weeks later, Wentworth narrowly escaped execution and was held in the Tower until 1652, when he was released. Although suspected of involvement in the 1659 Booth's Uprising, he lived quietly until the 1660 Stuart Restoration, when he regained his positions as Custos Rotulorum and Lord Lieutenant of Bedfordshire and was made Captain of the Gentlemen Pensioners. However, he was financially ruined and by the time he died in 1667, very few of his estates remained.

== Personal life ==
In 1611, he married Anne Croft, a daughter of Sir John Crofts, of Little Saxham, and the former Mary Shirley (a daughter of Sir Thomas Shirley, of Wiston). Before her death in January 1638, they were the parents of two children:

- Thomas Wentworth, 5th Baron Wentworth (1612–1665), who married Philadelphia Carey, daughter of Sir Ferdinando Carey and granddaughter of Sir Edmund Carey.
- Lady Anne Wentworth (1623–1697), who married John Lovelace, 2nd Baron Lovelace.

After the death of his first wife, he remarried to Lucy Wentworth, a daughter of Sir John Wentworth, 1st Baronet, of Gosfield, in October 1638. They were the parents of one daughter:

- Lady Catherine Wentworth (1639–1670), who married William Spencer, brother of Nicholas Spencer.

Lord Cleveland died at Toddington on 25 March 1667 and was buried at the Church of St George, Toddington, Bedfordshire on 4 April. Since his son predeceased him in 1665, the earldom of Cleveland became extinct, although his granddaughter Henrietta Maria became Baroness Wentworth suo jure.

== Sources ==
- Cockayne, G.E (1900). Complete Baronetage; Volume I 1611–1625. William Pollard & Co.
- Newman, P.R (1981). Royalist officers in England and Wales, 1642–1660: a biographical dictionary. Garland Publishers. ISBN 978-0824095031.
- Smith, David (2004). "Wentworth, Thomas, earl of Cleveland (1591-1667)". Oxford Dictionary of National Biography (online ed.). Oxford University Press. doi:10.1093/ref:odnb/29058. (Subscription, Wikipedia Library access or UK public library membership required.)
- Young, Peter; Holmes, Richard (2000). The English Civil War. Wordsworth. ISBN 978-1840222227.

Political offices
| Preceded by The Lord St John of Bletso | Custos Rotulorum of Bedfordshire; 1618–1667 | Succeeded by The Earl of Bolingbroke |
| Preceded by The Earl of Kent | Lord Lieutenant of Bedfordshire jointly with The Earl of Kent 1625–1627, 1629–1639; The Earl of Ailesbury 1660–1667; 1627–1667 | Succeeded by The Earl of Ailesbury |
Honorary titles
| Preceded by Interregnum | Captain of the Gentlemen Pensioners; 1660–1667 | Succeeded by The Lord Belasyse |
Peerage of England
| New creation | Earl of Cleveland; 1626–1667 | Extinct |
| Preceded by Henry Wentworth | Baron Wentworth (descended by acceleration); 1593–1640 | Succeeded by Thomas Wentworth |
| Preceded by Thomas Wentworth | Baron Wentworth; 1665–1667 | Succeeded by Henrietta Wentworth |
