= Senator Wentworth =

Senator Wentworth may refer to:

- Asa Wentworth Jr. (1797–1882), Vermont State Senate
- Jeff Wentworth (born 1940), Texas State Senate
- Tappan Wentworth (1802–1875), Massachusetts State Senate
