= Thomas Wentworth, 2nd Baron Wentworth =

English peer and courtier

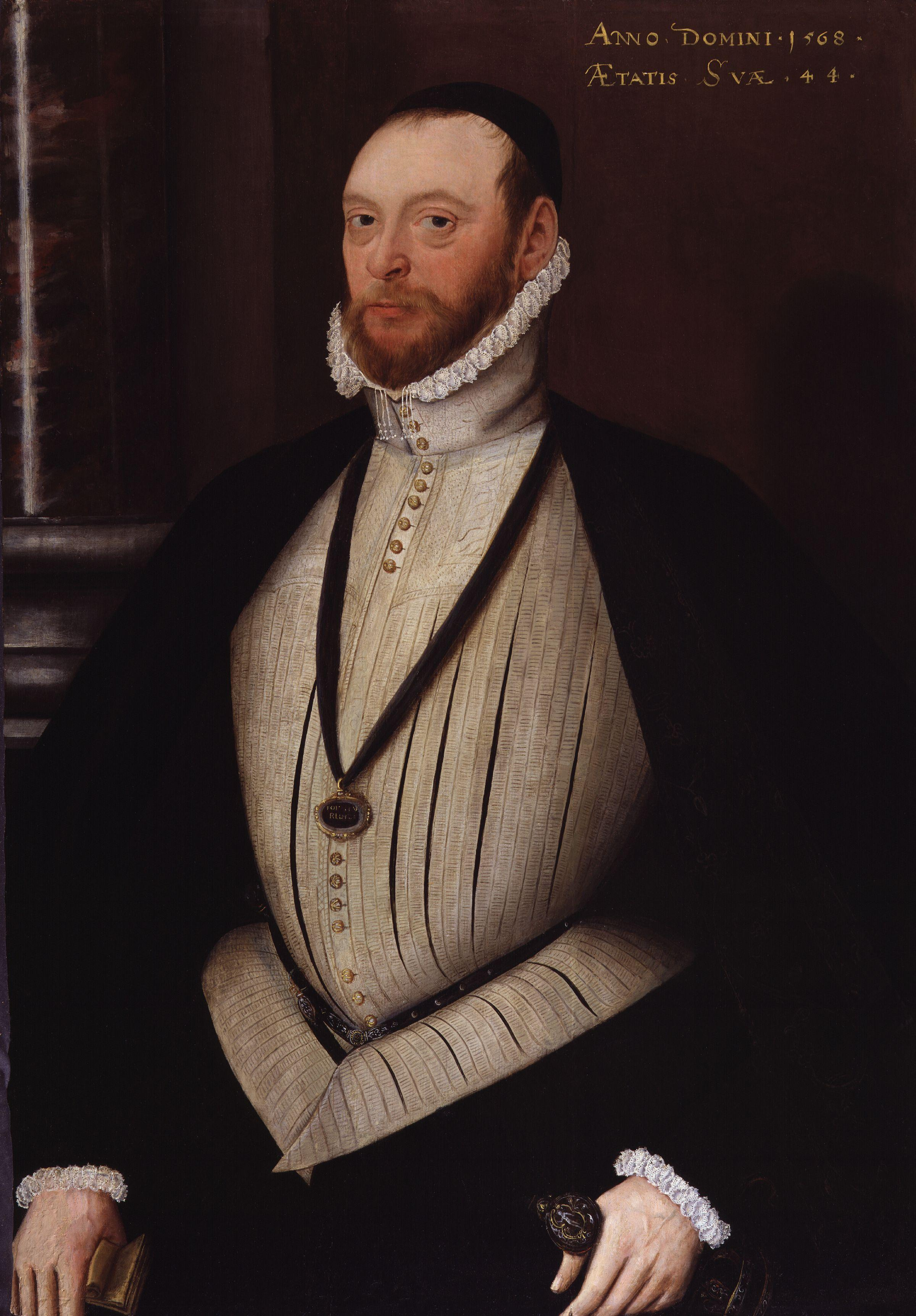
Thomas Wentworth, 2nd Baron Wentworth

Thomas Wentworth, 2nd Baron Wentworth (1525 – 13 January 1584) was an English peer, courtier, administrator and military commander during the reigns of Edward VI, Mary I, and Elizabeth I. His reputation suffered through the surrender of Calais in 1558, which occurred under his command.

== Career ==
The eldest son of Thomas Wentworth, 1st Baron Wentworth and Margaret Fortescue, of Nettlestead, Suffolk, Thomas studied at St John's College, Cambridge. He served with distinction under his relative the Lord Protector Edward Seymour, 1st Duke of Somerset at the Battle of Pinkie Cleugh in 1547, for which he was knighted at Roxburgh in August 1547. He sat as MP for Suffolk from 1547 to 1553: his father died in 1551, leaving him heir to his title, during the third prorogation, and he was replaced by Sir Thomas Cornwallis before the end of the parliament. He was one of the peers who found Somerset Not Guilty of treason, but Guilty on a capital charge of felony, in 1551.

Having signed the Letters Patent for the Limitation of the Crown, intended to favour the succession of Lady Jane Grey, on 21 June 1553, Wentworth was (according to Raphael Holinshed) among the first of the nobility to rally to the cause of Queen Mary while Queen Jane was being proclaimed in London. It is suggested that his support for Queen Mary arose from a conviction that her title to the Crown was rightful, rather than from a desire to restore Roman Catholicism. In mid-August 1553 he was empanelled to deliberate on the guilt of the Duke of Northumberland, the Marquess of Northampton and the Earl of Warwick, and then upon Sir Ambrose Dudley, Sir John Gates, Sir Henry Gates and Sir Thomas Palmer. Having given satisfaction by assisting in their condemnation, four days later Wentworth made his first appearance as a sworn member of the Privy Council at Richmond.

He was not required to sit in judgement upon Jane Grey in November 1553, but in December Mary appointed him Lord Deputy of Calais. Wentworth was the last Englishman to hold this post, for on 7 January 1558 he was compelled to surrender Calais to Francis, Duke of Guise, his representations as to the defenceless condition of the fortress having been disregarded by the Privy Council some years earlier. He was suspected of collusion with the enemy for his ineptitude and indecision during the final crisis, and was indicted for treason. (In fact his passive behaviour was probably owing to his certainty that the cause was hopeless.) His behaviour was unfavourably compared to the gallant defence of Guisnes, yet Guisnes also surrendered after a few days.

Wentworth was deprived of his manors at Stepney and Hackney at this time. He remained in France as a prisoner of war for more than a year, a delay which may have spared him the stigma for the loss of Calais. During that time Elizabeth succeeded to the throne, and although he was held in the Tower of London on his return to England, he was acquitted of treason in April 1559, and his manors were soon restored to him. Henry Machyn recorded his relief at the acquittal. In 1561, as Wentworth was rehabilitated, John Day published an English translation of Heinrich Bullinger's collection of One Hundred Sermons on the Apocalypse, and dedicated the work to him (as Lord Lieutenant of Suffolk) with a lengthy Epistle dated from Ipswich. Wentworth's religious views were tolerant.

At Ipswich on 30 December 1569, he made his declaration of obedience to the Act of Parliament for the Uniformity of Common Prayer. In 1572 he was among the Lords who sat in judgement at the trial for High Treason of Thomas Howard, 4th Duke of Norfolk, convicted and condemned him.

In March 1562/63, two of Wentworth's brothers, James and John, died in the loss of the Queen's ship Greyhound. Wentworth married twice, on both occasions to his kinswomen of other branches of the Wentworth family. The first wife was Mary Wentworth, daughter of Sir John Wentworth of Gosfield, and she died without children at Calais. The second wife, whom he probably married in 1555 or 1556, was Anne, daughter of Henry Wentworth, Esquire, of Mountnessing, Essex. Having become the mother of Wentworth's children, Dame Anne died on 2 September 1571 and was buried in Stepney church. Sir Thomas died intestate on 13 January 1584, and was probably buried near her.

== Children ==
- William Wentworth (died 7 November 1582), the eldest son, married Elizabeth Cecil (born 1 July 1564), a daughter of William Cecil, 1st Baron Burghley, but died at Theobalds, predeceasing his father.
- Henry Wentworth, 3rd Baron Wentworth (1558–1593), the second son, consequently succeeded to the title. He was one of the judges of Mary, Queen of Scots at Fotheringay in 1586. Henry married Anne Hopton (daughter of Sir Owen Hopton) and was father of Thomas Wentworth, 1st Earl of Cleveland.

== Popular culture ==
Wentworth appears as a minor character in the novel The Two Dianas by Alexandre Dumas.

== Sources ==
- McNeill, Ronald (1911). "Wentworth" . Encyclopædia Britannica. Vol. 28 (11th ed.). pp. 520–521, see page 520. "Thomas Wentworth, 2nd Baron Wentworth of Nettlestead (1525–1584), was....."
- Pollard, Albert (1899). "Wentworth, Thomas (1525-1584)" . Dictionary of National Biography. Vol. 60. pp. 265–267.
- "Wentworth, Thomas, second Baron Wentworth". Oxford Dictionary of National Biography (online ed.). Oxford University Press. doi:10.1093/ref:odnb/29054. (Subscription, Wikipedia Library access or UK public library membership required.)

Peerage of England
Preceded by Thomas Wentworth	Baron Wentworth; 1529–1551	Succeeded by Henry Wentworth
