= Richard Wentworth =

Richard Wentworth may refer to:

- Richard Wentworth (nobleman) (c. 1480 – 1528), English Nobleman
- Richard Wentworth (bass-baritone) (1911–1991), American opera singer and musical theatre actor
- Richard Wentworth (artist) (born 1947), British artist, curator and teacher
- Richard Alan Wentworth, mathematician at the University of Maryland
- Richard Wentworth, pulp magazine character as The Spider

== See also ==
- Richard de Wentworth (died 1339), Bishop of London
