= Wentworth Beaumont =

Wentworth Beaumont may refer to:

- Wentworth Beaumont, 1st Baron Allendale (1829–1907), British industrialist and politician
- Wentworth Beaumont, 1st Viscount Allendale (1860–1923), British politician
- Wentworth Beaumont, 2nd Viscount Allendale (1890–1956), British peer
- Wentworth Beaumont, 3rd Viscount Allendale (1922–2002), British peer
- Wentworth Beaumont, 4th Viscount Allendale (born 1948), British peer
