= William Wentworth (disambiguation) =

William Wentworth (1790–1872) was an Australian statesman, explorer, barrister, newspaper publisher, politician and landowner.

William Wentworth may also refer to:

Ordered chronologically

- William Wentworth, 2nd Earl of Strafford (1626–1695), United Kingdom peer, 2nd Earl of Strafford
- William Wentworth, 2nd Earl of Strafford (1722–1791), United Kingdom peer, 2nd Earl of Strafford of a later creation
- William Wentworth (elder) (1616–1697), ancestor of most North American Wentworths
- William P. Wentworth (1839–1896), American architect
- Bill Wentworth (1907–2003; William Charles Wentworth), Australian politician, first federal Minister for Aboriginal Affairs
