= Governor Wentworth =

Governor Wentworth may refer to:

- Sir John Wentworth, 1st Baronet (1737–1820), Governor of the province of New Hampshire from 1767 to 1775
- Benning Wentworth (1696–1770), Governor of the province of New Hampshire from 1741 to 1766
