= Robert Byng (Plymouth MP) =

British politician and colonial administrator (1703–1740)

Robert Byng (November 1703 – 6 October 1740) was a British Whig politician and colonial administrator who represented Plymouth in the House of Commons of Great Britain from 1728 to 1739. He also served as governor of Barbados for a short time before he died there. Byng was baptised on 27 November 1703, the third son of George Byng, 1st Viscount Torrington and his wife Margaret Master. He married Elizabeth Forward, the daughter of Jonathan Forward, on 19 December 1734.

Byng was appointed Cashier of the Navy in 1726 and was elected Member of Parliament (MP) for Plymouth on the British Admiralty's interest at a parliamentary by-election on 1 March 1728. He voted with the government in all recorded divisions. In 1732 he was promoted to Commissioner of the Navy and held the post until 1739. Byng was returned unopposed for Plymouth at the 1734 British general election. He spoke against a place bill on 22 April 1735. In May 1739, Byng was appointed governor of Barbados and resigned his seat in Parliament.

Byng died in Barbados on 6 October 1740 and was buried there on the 7th. He left three sons and his eldest son, George Byng later of Wrotham Park, was the father of John Byng, 1st Earl of Strafford. Byng was the brother of Admiral John Byng and Pattee Byng, 2nd Viscount Torrington.

Parliament of Great Britain
Preceded by Arthur Stert and George Treby	Member of Parliament for Plymouth; 1728–1739; With: Arthur Stert	Succeeded by John Rogers and Arthur Stert
Government offices
Preceded by The Viscount Gage	Governor of Barbados; 1739–1740	Succeeded by Sir Thomas Robinson
