= John Wentworth Jr. =

American Founding Father and politician

John Wentworth Jr. (July 17, 1745 – January 10, 1787) was a Founding Father of the United States and a lawyer who served as a New Hampshire delegate to the Continental Congress, where he signed the Articles of Confederation.

== Biography ==
Wentworth was born to Judge John Wentworth in Somersworth, New Hampshire, in 1745, and was a descendant of Elder William Wentworth. He graduated from Harvard in 1768 before studying law. He moved to Dover, New Hampshire, where he started his practice. Governor John Wentworth, his cousin, appointed him the probate register for Strafford County, and he held that post until his death.

Wentworth was active in the various revolutionary committees, and was elected to the convention (later the State Assembly) from Dover every year from 1776 to 1780. He was a member of the state council, supporting Meshech Weare, from 1780 to 1784, and was a member of the New Hampshire Committee of Safety. That committee operated as the revolutionary government when the Assembly was not in session.

In 1778 and 1779, he was selected as one of the delegates to the Continental Congress. His term of service gave him the chance to sign the Articles of Confederation when the Congress passed that plan to unify the colonies. As the state established a more stable government, he was elected to the New Hampshire Senate from 1784 to 1786. He died in Dover and is buried in the Pine Hill Cemetery there.
