= John Wentworth (judge) =

American revolutionary leader (1719–1781)

John Wentworth (March 30, 1719 – May 17, 1781) was a jurist, soldier, and leader of the American Revolution in New Hampshire. He was often referred to as the Judge or as Colonel John to distinguish him from his cousin, the John Wentworth who was the colony's governor. He is descended from early New Hampshire settler William Wentworth and is a great grandfather to John Wentworth (Illinois).

== Biography ==
This John Wentworth was born in Dover, New Hampshire. After service in the French and Indian War, he moved to Somersworth and was elected to the colonial assembly from 1768 to 1775. In that assembly he served several terms as speaker. He served as a judge of common pleas, and starting in 1776 as a justice in the New Hampshire supreme court, in spite of the fact that he neither studied nor practiced law.

As the revolution neared, he was active in the committees of correspondence, and later the Committee of Safety. After the Assembly was prorogued in 1774, a rebel counterpart met as the Exeter Convention. At their first meeting, on July 21 he was elected president. He died in Somersworth.

== Family ==
John survived his third wife, and left nine out of fourteen children. John's son, John Wentworth Jr., represented New Hampshire in the Continental Congress.
