= Henry Wentworth, 3rd Baron Wentworth =

English nobleman (1558–1593)

Henry Wentworth (1558–1593) was an English nobleman of his family's Nesttlestead line who served as the 3rd Baron Wentworth, succeeding his father, Thomas Wentworth, 2nd Baron Wentworth.

== Life ==
Wentworth was born in the summer of 1558 while his father – under whose command the loss of Calais happened – was held as a prisoner of war in France and inherited the title Baron at age 26, shortly after his father's death. He participated in the trials of the "unhappy" Mary, Queen of Scots, being one of the few peers to witness the final judgement of Fotheringhay in 1586. In 1587, accompanied by the Earl of Leicester, he visited the Netherlands. Later in his life, are documented his visits to a Gray's Inn and the rectories of Hackney and Stepney on 2 August 1588, 8 May 1593 and 1584, respectively. Following the Spanish Armada in 1588, he was at court again.

Notably, right after his accession of the title Baron, he ordered half a tun of rum in Ipswich.

Wentworth died due to "the plague" – as was noted as death cause – on 16 August 1593 while visiting the grounds of Sir James Harrington near Rutlandshire at age thirty-five.

== Family ==
Henry was the son of Thomas Wentworth, 2nd Baron Wentworth and Anne Wentworth, daughter of Henry Wentworth, an Esquire, of Mountnessing. Henry married Anne Hopton, daughter of Owen Hopton. They had two daughters (one of whom was called Jane), and two sons. His oldest son, Thomas Wentworth, 1st Earl of Cleveland, succeeded him as Baron Wentworth). His other son, Henry, died in 1644. The children were very young at his death, and Anne remarried, to William Pope, 1st Earl of Downe.

Henry's place of burial is unknown.
