= Thomas Wentworth, 1st Baron Wentworth =

English peer and courtier

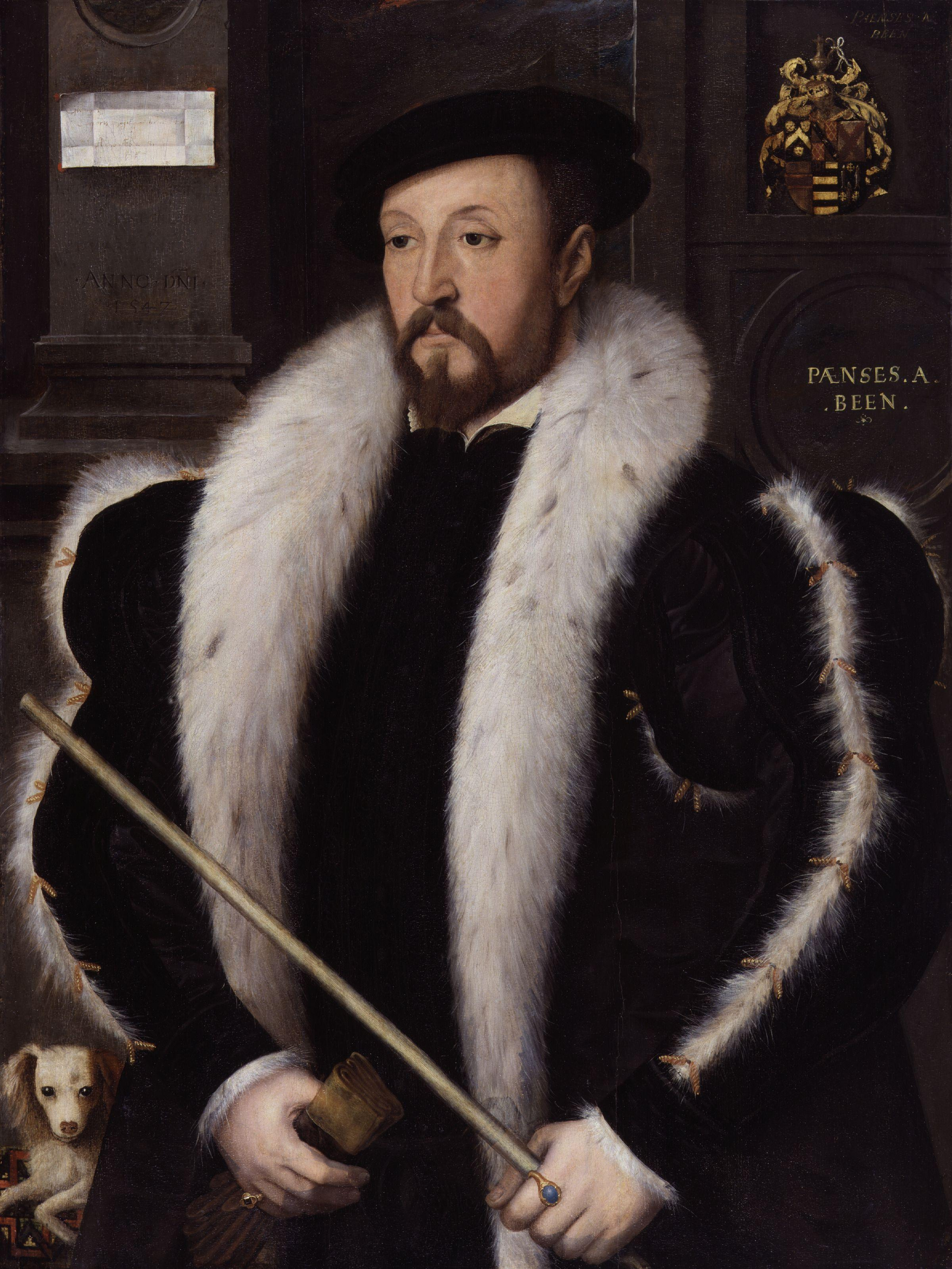
Thomas Wentworth, 1st Baron Wentworth

Thomas Wentworth, 1st Baron Wentworth and de jure 6th Baron le Despencer, PC (1501 – 3 March 1551) was an English peer and courtier during the Tudor dynasty.

The Wentworths were originally from Yorkshire but a branch of the family had settled in Nettlestead, Suffolk in the mid-fifteenth century, where Wentworth was born. He was the eldest son of Sir Richard Wentworth, de jure 5th Baron le Despencer of the 1387 creation, and was a nephew of Margery Wentworth, the mother of Jane Seymour. His mother was Anne Tyrrell, the daughter of Sir James Tyrrell, the supposed murderer of the Princes in the Tower. He had two younger brothers, Philip and Richard, and five sisters, Anne, Elizabeth, Dorothy, Margery and Thomasine.

Through his father he was the first cousin of Queen Jane Seymour (c. 1508 – 1537), Thomas Darcy, 1st Baron Darcy of Chiche (1506–1558) and Vice-Admiral Thomas Wyndham (1508–1554). Portraits of all four were in the Lumley Collection.

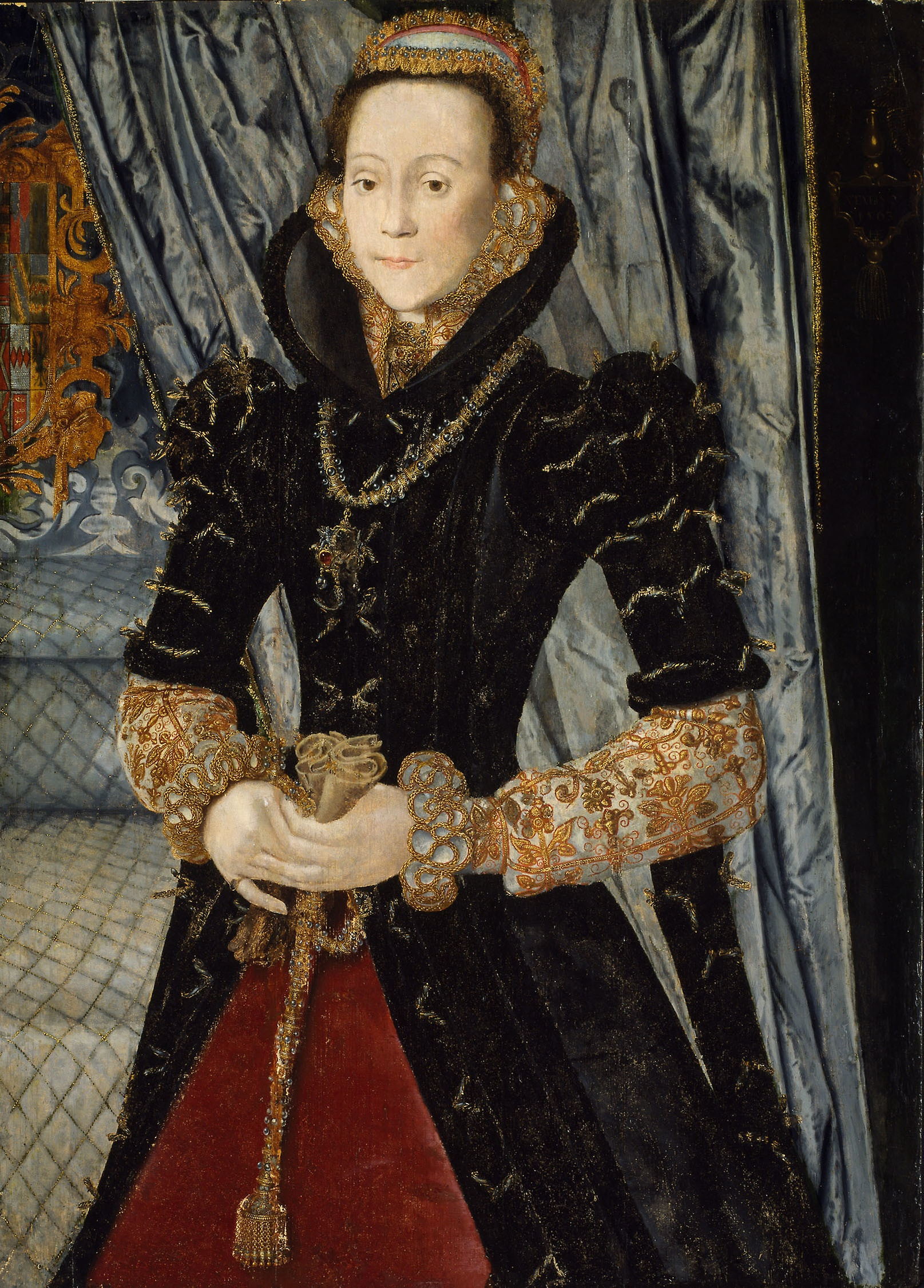
Portrait of a Lady of the Wentworth Family (Probably Jane Cheyne), 1563 by Hans Eworth.

Around 1520 Wentworth married Margaret Fortescue, the eldest daughter of Sir Adrian Fortescue. They had a large family of eight sons and nine daughters, including Thomas, later 2nd Baron Wentworth. Among his daughters, Cecily married Robert Wingfield, Jane married Henry Cheyne, 1st Baron Cheyne, Margery married firstly John Williams, 1st Baron Williams of Thame and secondly Sir William Drury, Dorothy married the explorer Martin Frobisher and Anne married John Pooley.

In 1523, Wentworth took part in Suffolk's failed invasion of France and was knighted by him. In 1529, he was also created Baron Wentworth in the Peerage of England. He was one of the peers who signed the letter to the pope in favour of Henry VIII's divorce from Catherine of Aragon. In 1536, he was present at the trials of Anne Boleyn and her brother, Lord Rochford and at those of Lord Montagu and the Marquess of Exeter in 1538.

In 1550, Lord Wentworth was appointed Lord Chamberlain to Edward VI and died the following year. His funeral was held at Westminster Abbey and he was buried in the abbey's Chapel of St John the Baptist. His title passed to his eldest son, Thomas.

== Notes ==
Peerage of England
New creation	Baron Wentworth; 1529–1551	Succeeded by Thomas Wentworth
Political offices
Preceded by The Lord St John	Lord Chamberlain; 1550–1551	Succeeded by The Lord Darcy of Chiche
