= John Lovelace, 2nd Baron Lovelace =

17th century English peer

John Lovelace
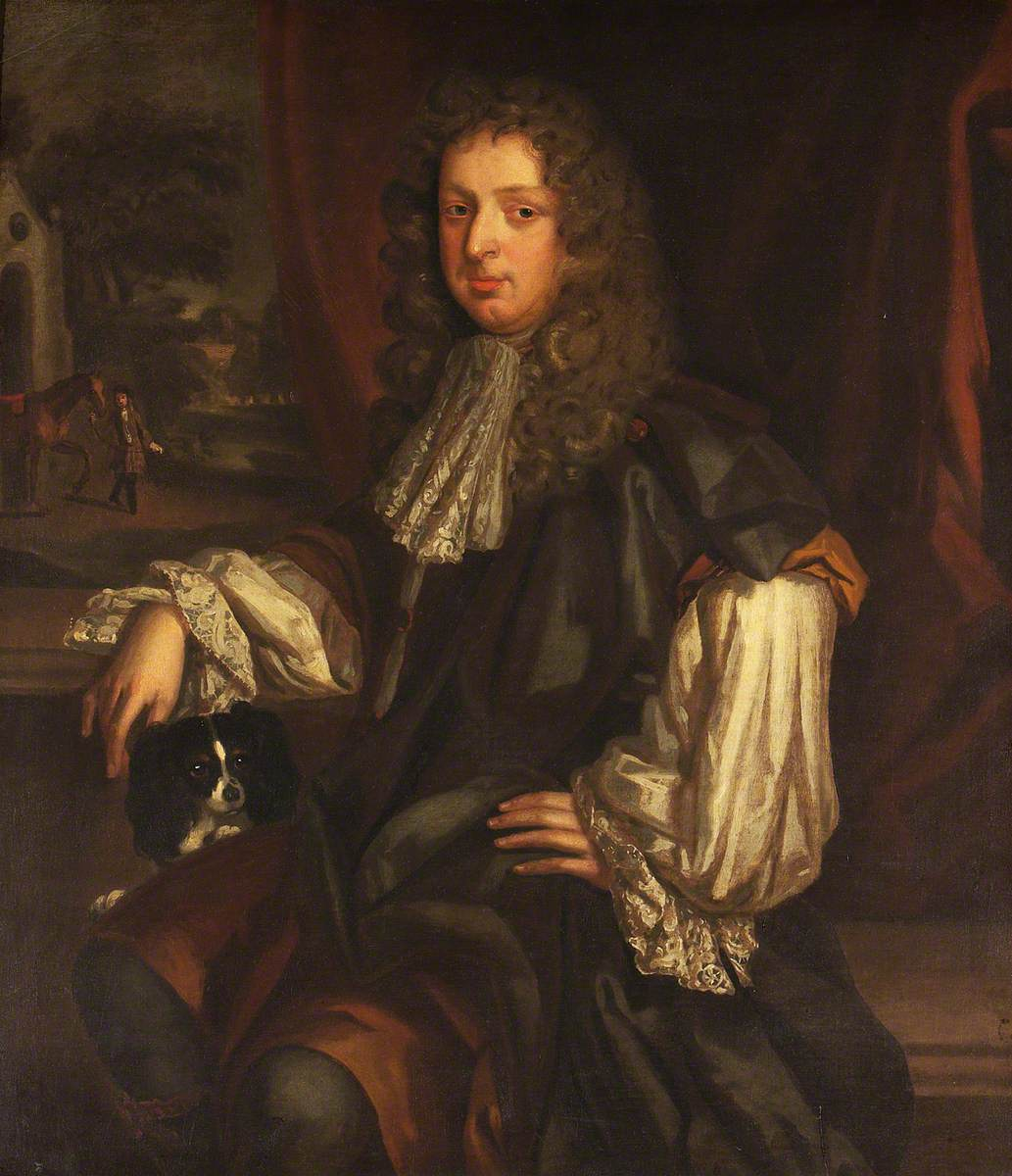
- John Lovelace, 2nd Baron Lovelace

Lord Lieutenant of Berkshire
- In office 28 August 1660 – 25 November 1670

Personal details
- Born: 1 February 1616 Hurley, Berkshire
- Died: 25 November 1670 (aged 54) Woodstock Palace, Berkshire
- Spouse: Anne Lovelace, 7th Baroness Wentworth
- Education: Christ Church, Oxford

John Lovelace, 2nd Baron Lovelace (February 1616 – 25 November 1670) was an English baron from Berkshire and Royal servant.

== Life ==
John was born in Hurley, Berkshire, eldest son of Richard Lovelace, 1st Baron Lovelace and his wife, Margaret Dodworth, and educated at Christ Church, Oxford. He lived at Ladye Place which he inherited on the death of his father. Like his son the third Baron, he was a notoriously heavy drinker, and chronically in debt.

He was an ardent Royalist and was committed by the Parliamentarians to the Tower of London and made to pay a heavy fine of 18,373l. 1s. 10d. After the restoration of the Monarchy, he was appointed Lord Lieutenant of Berkshire from 28 August 1660 to 25 November 1670. In 1670 he was made steward of the old Royal palace at Woodstock and died in the palace gatehouse on 25 September 1670. He was buried on 1 October 1670 in the old priory church in Hurley.

After his death, he was succeeded by his son John Lovelace, 3rd Baron Lovelace, who according to uncharitable acquaintances inherited both his father's debts and his weakness for drink. His wife Anne, daughter of Thomas Wentworth, 1st Earl of Cleveland and Anne Crofts, succeeded her niece as 7th Baroness Wentworth, which after her death passed to their granddaughter Martha Johnson. His daughter Dorothy Lovelace married Henry Drax (1641–1682), a plantation owner in Barbados.

Honorary titles
Interregnum	Lord Lieutenant of Berkshire; 1660–1670	Succeeded by The Duke of Cumberland
Peerage of England
Preceded by Richard Lovelace	Baron Lovelace; 1634–1670	Succeeded by John Lovelace
