= Church of St George, Toddington, Bedfordshire =

Church in Bedfordshire, England

Coordinates: 51.9498°N 0.5318°W

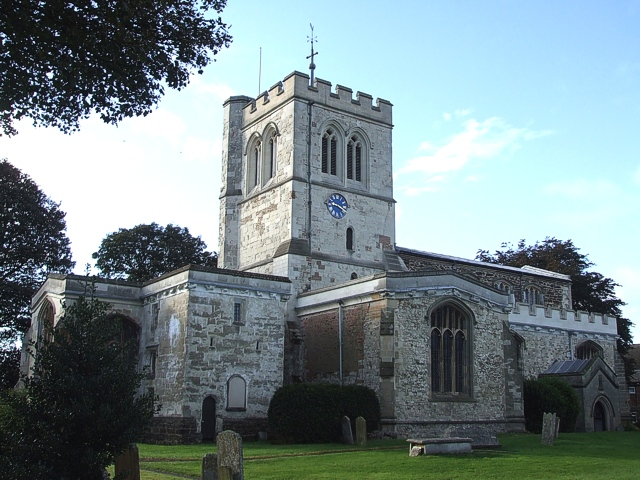

Church of St George is a Grade I listed church in Toddington, Bedfordshire, England. It became a listed building on 3 February 1967.

== History ==
The church was built from Totternhoe stone and ironstone, and was paid for by Paulinus Peyvre. St Georges was consecrated on St George's Day, 1222, coincidentally the same day that St George replaced St Edmund as the official patron saint of England.

On Friday January 1, 1976, the church saw damage from the Gale of January 1976.On Saturday 17th, a thanksgiving service was held with a rededication by the Bishop of Bedford

== Notable people ==
Henry Cheyne, 1st Baron Cheyne is buried here.

== See also ==
- Grade I listed buildings in Bedfordshire
