= Richard Lovelace, 1st Baron Lovelace =

English politician (1564–1634)

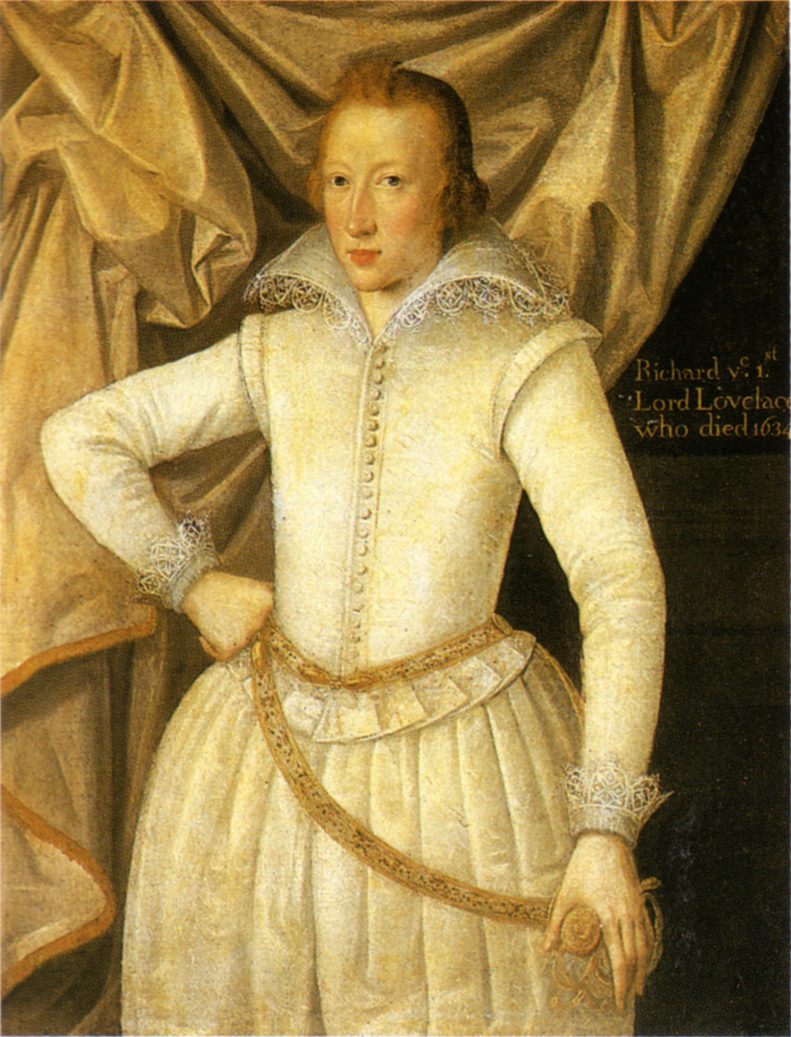
Portrait of Richard Lovelace as a young man, by John de Critz

Richard Lovelace, 1st Baron Lovelace (1564 – 22 April 1634) of Hurley, Berkshire was an English politician who sat in the House of Commons at various times between 1601 and 1622. He was raised to the peerage as Baron Lovelace in 1627.

Lovelace was born the son of Richard Lovelace and his wife, Anne, the daughter of Richard Warde of Hurst, also in Berkshire. He was educated at Merton College, Oxford in 1584, knighted in 1599, and succeeded his father in 1602.

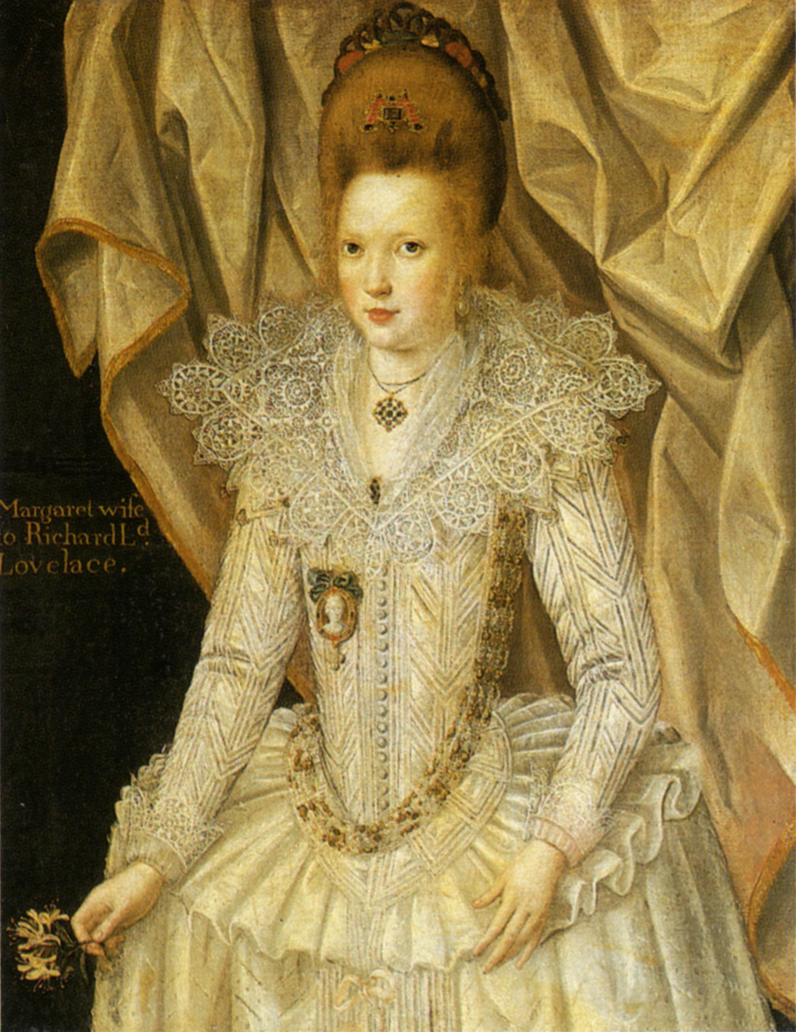
Portrait of Margaret, Lady Lovelace, Wife of Richard, 1st Lord Lovelace by John de Critz

Lovelace became a soldier and commanded a force under the Lord Deputy in Ireland, after which he was knighted in Dublin by the Earl of Essex. His association with the earl led to a brief period of imprisonment on charges of plotting against Queen Elizabeth I but he was released without charge.

He was elected to the Parliament of England to represent Berkshire in 1601, Abingdon in 1604, New Windsor in 1614 and Berkshire again in 1621.

He was selected High Sheriff of Berkshire for 1610–11 and for Oxfordshire for 1626–27. In 1627 he was created Baron Lovelace of Hurley by Charles I. Lovelace died in Hurley in 1634.

He had married twice: firstly, Katherine, daughter of Sir George Gyll and widow of William Hyde of Denchworth in Berkshire (now Oxfordshire) (no children) and, secondly, Margaret, daughter and co-heir of a rich merchant, William Dodworth, with whom he had four sons and five daughters. The eldest son was his heir John Lovelace, 2nd Baron Lovelace and a daughter Elizabeth married the regicide Henry Marten.

His son Francis should not be confused with the person of the same name who became the second Governor of the New York colony but who was however the grandfather of John Lovelace, 4th Baron Lovelace, who was a later Governor.

Parliament of England
Preceded by Sir Henry Norreys; Francis Knollys	Member of Parliament for Berkshire; 1601; With: George Hyde	Succeeded by Sir Henry Neville; Francis Knollys
Preceded by Robert Ryche	Member of Parliament for Abingdon; 1604–1611	Succeeded by Sir Robert Knollys
Preceded by Samuel Backhouse; Francis Howard	Member of Parliament for New Windsor; 1614; With: Thomas Woodward	Succeeded by Charles Howard; Robert Bennet
Preceded by Sir Henry Neville; Sir Thomas Parry	Member of Parliament for Berkshire; 1621–1622; With: Sir Robert Knollys	Succeeded by Edmund Dunch; Sir Richard Harrison
Peerage of England
New creation	Baron Lovelace; 1627–1634	Succeeded by John Lovelace
