= Baron Lovelace =

Extinct barony in the Peerage of England

Baron Lovelace, of Hurley in the County of Berks, was a title in the Peerage of England. It was created on 31 May 1627 for Sir Richard Lovelace, who had earlier represented Berkshire, Abingdon and Windsor in Parliament. The second Baron served as Lord Lieutenant of Berkshire. The third Baron sat as Member of Parliament for Berkshire. The fourth Baron was Governor of New York and New Jersey. The title became extinct on the early death of the sixth Baron in 1736.

The Lovelace title was revived in 1838 when William King, 8th Baron King was made Earl of Lovelace. He was the husband of Ada, daughter of Lord Byron and a descendant of the Barons Lovelace.

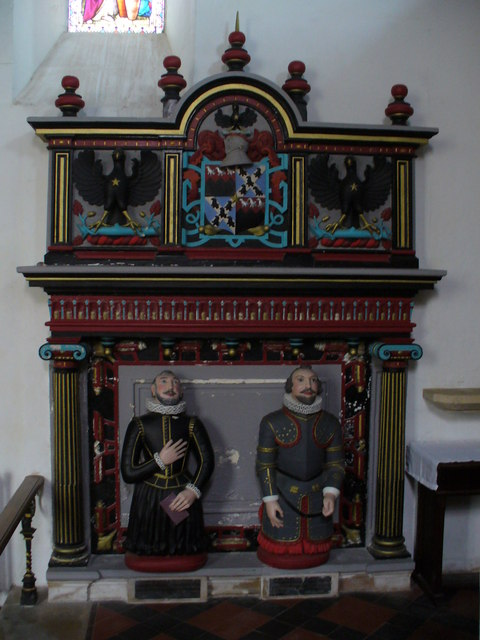
Lovelace Memorial in St Mary's church, Hurley

== Barons Lovelace (1627) ==
- Richard Lovelace, 1st Baron Lovelace (c. 1567–1634)
- John Lovelace, 2nd Baron Lovelace (1616–1670)
- John Lovelace, 3rd Baron Lovelace (c. 1640–1693)
- John Lovelace, 4th Baron Lovelace (d. 1709)
- John Lovelace, 5th Baron Lovelace (d. 1709)
- Neville Lovelace, 6th Baron Lovelace (1708–1736)

== See also ==
- Earl of Lovelace
- Baron Wentworth
