= John Lovelace, 3rd Baron Lovelace =

English politician (1641–1693)

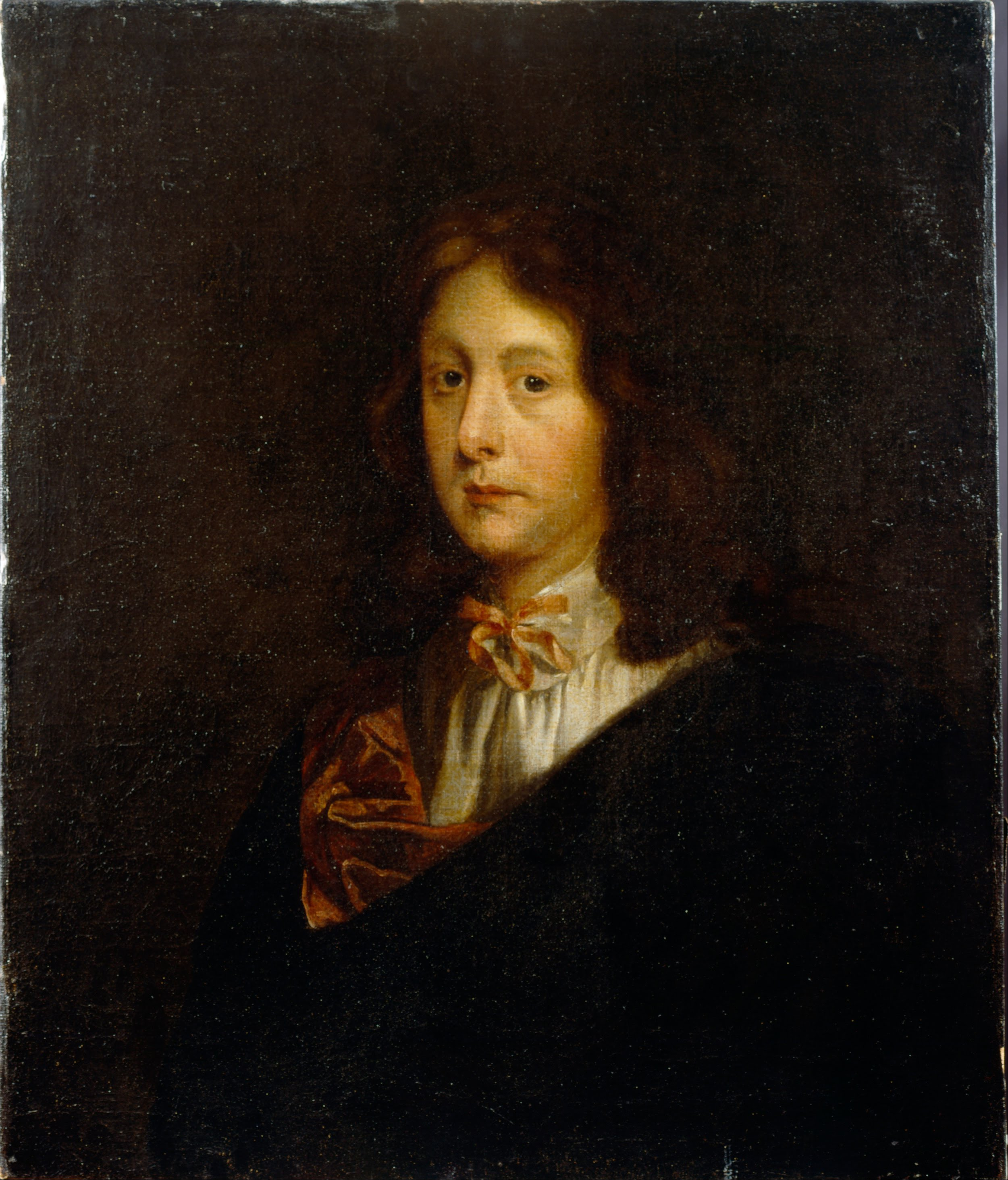
John Lovelace in the early 1660s

John Lovelace, 3rd Baron Lovelace (1641 – 27 September 1693) was an English politician who sat in the House of Commons from 1661 to 1670 when he inherited the title Baron Lovelace. He was notorious for his drunken and extravagant way of life, which undoubtedly hastened his death.

== Life ==
Lovelace was born at Hurley, Berkshire, the son of John Lovelace, 2nd Baron Lovelace, and Anne Lovelace, 7th Baroness Wentworth and Baroness le Despenser. suo jure (née Lady Anne Wentworth). He matriculated at Wadham College, Oxford, on 25 July 1655, and was awarded MA on 9 September 1661.

In 1661, Lovelace was elected Member of Parliament for Berkshire in the Cavalier Parliament, and sat in the Commons until 1670 when he inherited the peerage on the death of his father. He developed a reputation as an ardent Whig, and during the Exclusion Crisis he strongly supported Exclusion. Though he professed to be a Puritan in religion, he was also a keen sportsman, and notorious as a heavy drinker and gambler. Due to his gambling debts, and other debts he inherited from his father, he was obliged in the end to sell nearly all his lands, including the main family residence of Hurley. He was called "a man of good natural parts, but of very loose and very ill principles".

Lovelace was also notably anti-Catholic: under the Catholic regime of James II he created a scandal when a Catholic magistrate sent him a summons, which he used in public to wipe his bottom, for which misdemeanour he was severely reprimanded by the Privy Council, and threatened with prosecution. J.P. Kenyon remarks that a more sensible ruler than James II would have let the matter drop, as a rather tasteless joke with no political overtones.

Following the discovery of the Rye House Plot, Lovelace was questioned as to his involvement, but nothing could be proved against him, despite his close political links to some of the alleged plotters.

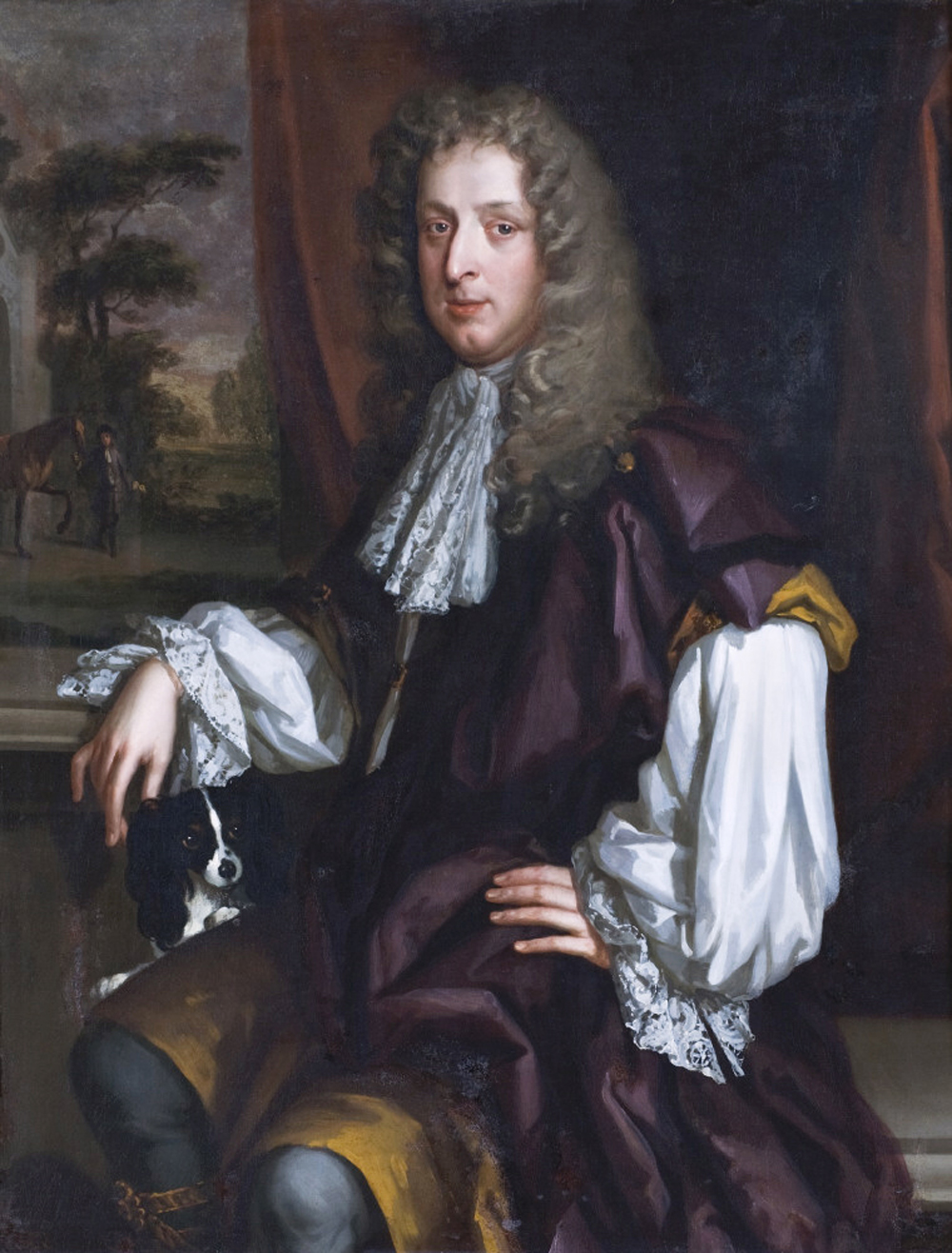
John Lovelace circa 1670

== Glorious Revolution ==
He was admitted into the confidence of those organising the Glorious Revolution to replace the Catholic James II with the Protestant William of Orange. In March 1688, he was summoned before the Privy Council and questioned about his dealings with William, but was released on account of insufficient evidence. He protested his loyalty to James in person, but the King was unimpressed, saying angrily: "My Lord, this is not the first trick you have played me". Lovelace indignantly replied "I never played a trick on your majesty or anyone else".

He arranged secret meetings in a cellar at Ladye Place, his home in Hurley. Once he heard that William had landed in England, he set out with 70 men to join him, but was captured by the militia (commanded by Henry Somerset) after a skirmish at Cirencester and imprisoned in Gloucester Castle. After his release, he entered Oxford with a force of 300 cavalry to occupy the city for William.

== Last years and death ==
Lovelace was appointed Captain of the Gentlemen Pensioners in 1689 and was Chief Justice in Eyre south of Trent. However his conduct hardly fitted him for any public office: he was nearly always drunk, and by 1691 was reported to be wandering the streets of London assaulting strangers. In 1692, suffering from the ill effects of a lifetime of alcoholic excess, Lovelace fell down a flight of stairs and received injuries from which he never recovered. He died in 1693 in Lincoln's Inn Fields, London at the age of about 53.

== Family ==
Lovelace married in 1662 Martha Pye, the daughter and coheiress of Sir Edmund Pye, 1st Baronet, of Bradenham, Buckinghamshire, and his wife Catherine Lucas, daughter of Thomas Lucas. They had one son, John, who died in infancy, and three daughters. The peerage passed to his cousin William's son, John Lovelace, 4th Baron Lovelace, who became Governor of the New York colony. Lovelace's daughter Martha married Henry Johnson, said to be 'the greatest shipbuilder and shipowner of his day'; and succeeded her grandmother as the 8th Baroness Wentworth.

== Notes ==
Legal offices
Preceded by The Earl of Huntingdon	Justice in Eyre south of the Trent; 1689–1693	Succeeded by The Earl of Abingdon
Parliament of England
Preceded by Richard Powle; Sir Robert Pye	Member of Parliament for Berkshire; 1661–1670; With: Richard Powle	Succeeded by Richard Powle; Richard Neville
Peerage of England
Preceded by John Lovelace	Baron Lovelace; 1670–1693	Succeeded by John Lovelace
Honorary titles
Preceded by The Earl of Huntingdon	Captain of the Gentlemen Pensioners; 1689–1693	Succeeded by Charles Beauclerk
