= John Lovelace, 4th Baron Lovelace =

English military officer, governor of the provinces of New York and New Jersey

John Lovelace, 4th Baron Lovelace of Hurley

2nd Colonial Governor of New Jersey
- In office March 1708 – 6 May 1709
- Monarch: Anne
- Lieutenant: Richard Ingoldesby
- Preceded by: Viscount Cornbury
- Succeeded by: Richard Ingoldesby (Lt. Governor)

15th Colonial Governor of New York
- In office March 1708 – 6 May 1709
- Monarch: Anne
- Lieutenant: Richard Ingoldesby
- Preceded by: Viscount Cornbury
- Succeeded by: Richard Ingoldsby (Acting Governor)

Personal details
- Born: 1672 England
- Died: 6 May 1709 (aged 36–37) New York City
- Resting place: Trinity Church Cemetery, New York City
- Spouse: Charlotte Clayton
- Children: John, Charlotte, Charles, Neville & Wentworth (twins), Martha
- Profession: Governor

John Lovelace, 4th Baron Lovelace (1672—1709) was the Governor of both New York and New Jersey.

== Biography ==
He was the son of William Lovelace of Hurst, Berkshire. He was the grandson of Francis Lovelace, son of Richard Lovelace, 1st Baron Lovelace. Despite being born into an aristocratic family, the 3rd Baron Lovelace had weakened the family's fortunes through gambling, leaving John heavily in debt. He served in the military following the inheritance of his peerage. In 1701, Lord Lovelace married Charlotte, the daughter of Sir John Clayton, but her poor dowry little improved his financial situation. The couple had six children: John (d. 1709), Charlotte (d. 1705), Charles (d. 1707), Wentworth (d. 1709), Neville (d. 1736) and Martha (d. 1788), who married Lord Henry Beauclerk in 1739.

No portraits of the 4th Baron Lovelace have surfaced to date. However, in 1705 he was described by a Scottish writer named John Macky as follows: "Lieutenant Colonel of the Horse Guards; a very pretty gentleman of good sense and well at court; a short, fat brown man, not forty years old."

On 21 March 1708, Lord Lovelace was appointed to the governorship of New York and New Jersey to replace Lord Cornbury. After a harrowing nine-week trans-Atlantic voyage Governor Lovelace, his wife and three sons John, Wentworth, and Neville arrived in New York on 18 December 1708. Well received by the Assemblies of both colonies, he proceeded to convict several of Cornbury's supporters, members of the corrupt Cornbury Ring, including former Governor Jeremiah Basse.

Lord Lovelace was granted £1,600 by a revenue bill on 5 May 1709. However, during the last month of his six-month tenure, two of the Governor's sons—John and Wentworth—died, probably of pneumonia, and he himself died on 6 May 1709. His funeral was held in Trinity Church, New York City and he was buried on 12 May in the Trinity Church Cemetery. His widow and two-year-old son Neville returned to London, where Lady Charlotte gave birth to Martha who was baptised in Westminster on 14 January 1710.

== See also ==
- List of colonial governors of New Jersey
- List of colonial governors of New York

Government offices
Preceded by Viscount Cornbury	Governor of the Province of New Jersey; 1708–1709	Succeeded by Richard Ingoldesby
Preceded by Viscount Cornbury	Governor of the Province of New York; 1708–1709	Succeeded by Richard Ingoldsby (acting)
Peerage of England
Preceded by John Lovelace	Baron Lovelace; 1693–1709	Succeeded by Neville Lovelace
