= Earl of Lovelace =

Extinct earldom in the Peerage of the United Kingdom

Earldom of Lovelace
- Arms of King: Sable, three Spear Heads Argent, imbrued proper, on a Chief Or, three Battle-Axes Azure; Crest: A Cubit Arm, vested Azure, charged with three Ermine Spots in fess Or, cuffed Argent, grasping in the hand proper, the broken shaft of a Spear in bend sinister Sable, the butt Argent; Supporters: On either side a Mastiff Dog reguardant proper, collared Gules.
- Creation date: 30 June 1838
- Created by: Queen Victoria
- Peerage: Peerage of the United Kingdom
- First holder: William King, 8th Baron King of Ockham
- Last holder: Peter King, 5th Earl of Lovelace
- Remainder to: heirs male of the body of the grantee
- Subsidiary titles: Viscount Ockham; Baron King
- Status: Extinct
- Extinction date: 31 January 2018
- Motto: LABOR IPSE VOLUPTAS ("Labour itself is a pleasure")

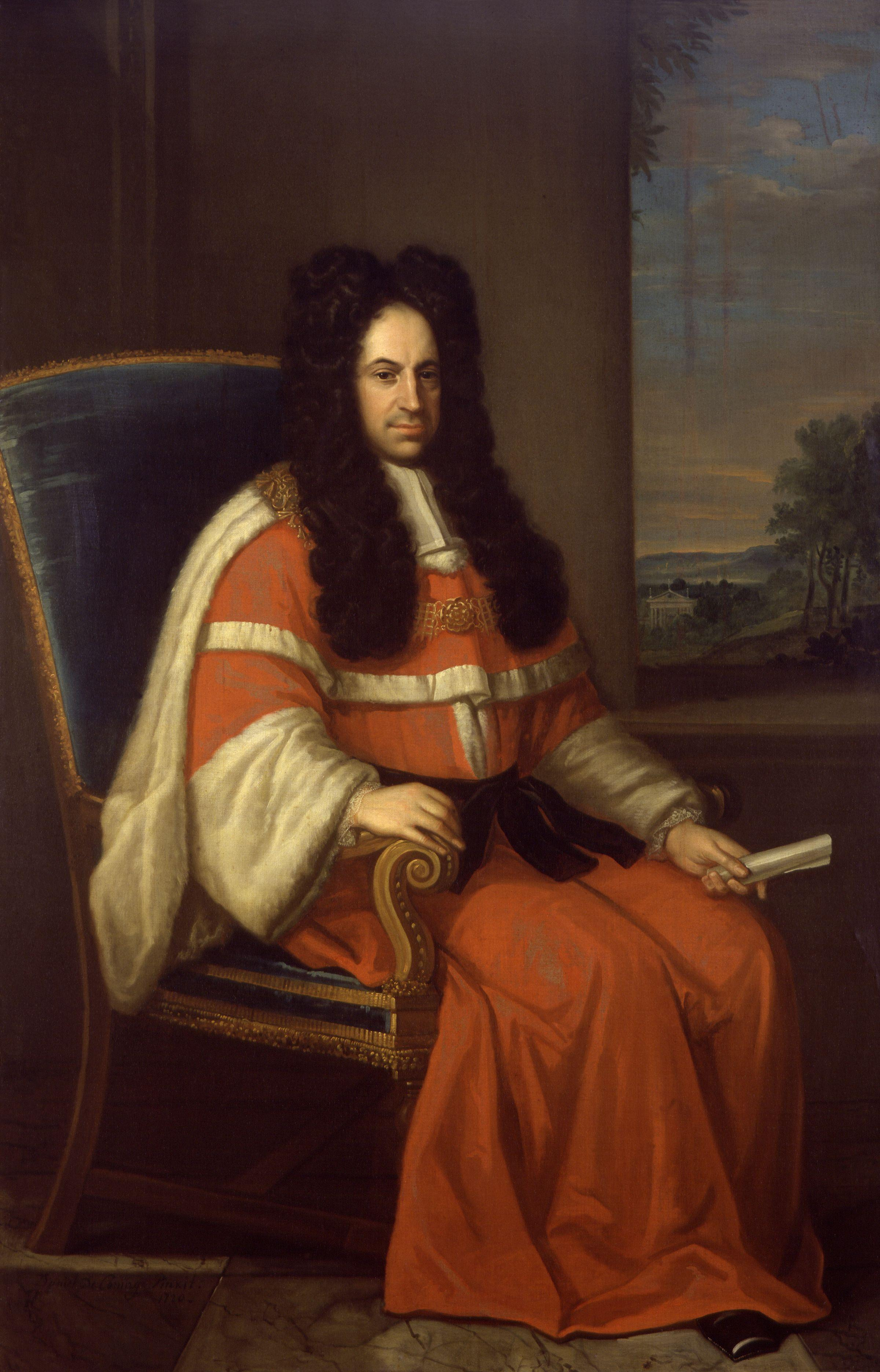
Peter King, 1st Baron King, by Daniel de Coning, 1720.

Earl of Lovelace was a title in the Peerage of the United Kingdom. It was created in 1838 for William King-Noel, 8th Baron King, a title created in 1725.

== History ==
The King or Locke King family stems from the only known child of Jerome King, a grocer, of Exeter, and his wife Anne, (Note: Her father was Peter Locke.) first cousin of the leading philosopher of quite low birth, John Locke. This child was Sir Peter King, a prominent lawyer and politician who served as Lord Chief Justice of the Common Pleas from 1714 to 1725, and as Lord High Chancellor of Great Britain from 1725 to 1733; as such, in 1725 he was created Baron King of Ockham in the County of Surrey, in the Peerage of Great Britain (verbally and less formally Lord King). The estate he bought was chosen as his territorial designation.

He was succeeded by his eldest son (the second Baron) who represented Launceston and Exeter in the House of Commons but died aged 34. His three younger brothers—Peter, William and Thomas—all succeeded in the barony. Thomas was succeeded by his son, the sixth Baron, whose son, the seventh Baron, was a Whig politician and writer. On his death in 1833, the title passed to his eldest son, the eighth Baron.

In 1835, the eighth Baron married as his first wife the Hon. (Augusta) Ada Byron, the only daughter of the poet Lord Byron and his wife 11th Baroness Wentworth (Anne Isabella Milbanke), who was a descendant of the extinct Barons Lovelace. In 1838 the eighth Baron was created Viscount Ockham (territorial designation the same, to be the family's first courtesy title), and Earl of Lovelace in the Peerage of the United Kingdom. He was appointed the Lord-Lieutenant of Surrey from 1840 to 1893. Ada died in 1852, leaving her husband, in his forties, a widower. In 1860, he assumed for himself by Royal licence the additional surname and arms of Noel, those of Wentworth. In 1865 he remarried, to Jane Crawford Jenkins (Note: a widow) and had one child, who would eventually inherit the earldom. Lord Lovelace acquired Horsley Towers (now a hotel) in East Horsley and was patron of the parish church funding the rebuilding of the chancel and the nave in 1869. He also rebuilt the wall of the churchyard which included a number of architectural features such as the gazebo and its family crest-engraved walls. He planned for his death 20 years before he died when work began on building his mausoleum in another corner of the churchyard. The mausoleum, which has recently been restored, contains his tomb and that of his second wife. His eldest son Byron, Viscount Ockham, briefly succeeded his maternal grandmother to become the 12th Baron Wentworth according to its special remainder in 1860. However, he predeceased his father, unmarried, two years later.

At his death in 1893, the 1st Earl of Lovelace was succeeded by his second son Ralph (1839–1906), who was then already the 13th Baron Wentworth. In 1861, Ralph had assumed by Royal licence the surname of Milbanke in lieu of Noel.

The 2nd Earl of Lovelace had no sons and was succeeded in the barony of Wentworth by his only child, Ada King-Milbanke, 14th Baroness Wentworth. (Note: With its wide remainder, the 14th Baroness was succeeded by her aunt Anne Blunt, 15th Baroness Wentworth, daughter of the first Earl; see the Baron Wentworth for later history of this title) His other titles passed to his half-brother Lionel (1865–1929), the 3rd Earl.

In 1895, the 3rd Earl of Lovelace had received for himself only Royal licence to use the additional surname and arms of Noel, but resumed by Royal licence, in 1908, the surname and arms of King only for himself and his children. He served in the First World War as a Major in the Northumberland Fusiliers and as a staff-Captain.

The titles were finally held by his grandson, the 5th Earl (1951–2018), who succeeded his father in 1964 and died in 2018. As there were no heirs to the earldom of Lovelace, to the viscountcy of Ockham and to the barony of King of Ockham, these all became extinct at his death.

== Family seats ==
The family seat following its purchase by the 1st Lord King was Ockham Park, Ockham, Surrey until the fine Jacobean house was reduced to outbuildings in a fire in 1948. The family then moved its main home to Torridon House, near Torridon in Ross-shire.

After the 1st Baron King's death in 1734, the King Chapel was added to All Saints' Church, Ockham, intended as a chapel over the family vault of the Lords King and their descendants.

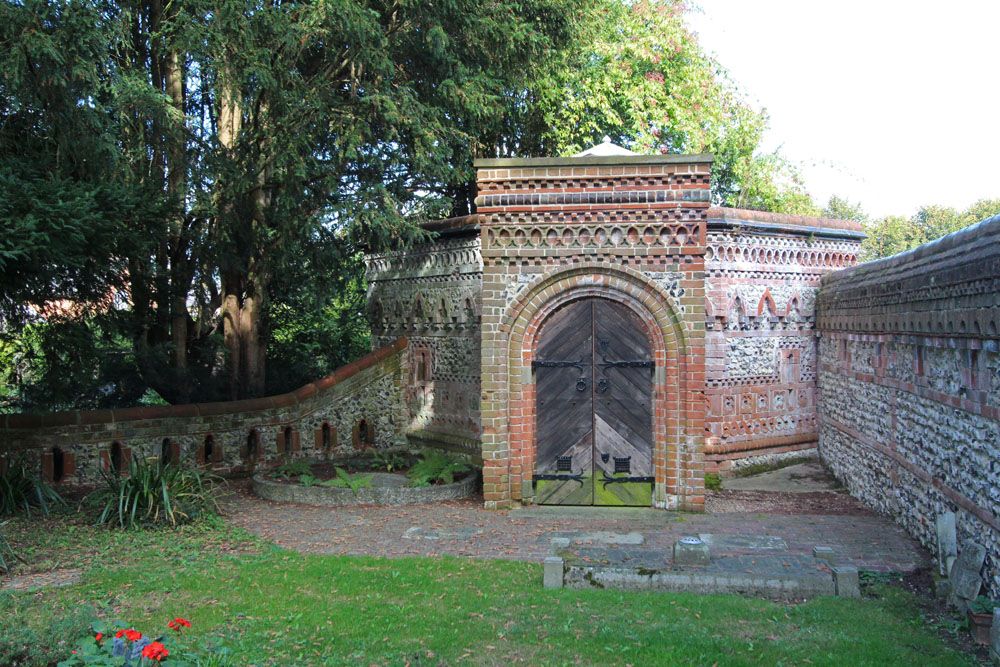
The 1st Earl of Lovelace's Mausoleum in the churchyard of Martin's Church, East Horsley

The traditional burial place of the Earls of Lovelace was at Martin's Church, East Horsley. The 1st Earl is buried in a mausoleum in a corner of the churchyard, the 2nd Earl was cremated at Woking Crematorium (his ashes are buried in the King Chapel of All Saints' Church, Ockham), while the 3rd Earl and his wife Edith († 1932), the 4th Earl and his wife Doris († 1940) as well as the Lovelace daughters Lady Diana de Hosszu († 1955) and Lady Penelope Allen († 1947) rest in the churchyard of Martin's, where the "Lovelace Plot" was set apart for “myself, my heirs and (...) the exclusive right in perpetuity of burial and placing monuments and gravestones” by the 3rd Earl in 1909.

== Barons King (1725) (of Ockham) (Note: There have been other King peerages, each of them life peerages.) ==
- Peter King, 1st Baron King (1669–1734)
- John King, 2nd Baron King (1706–1740)
- Peter King, 3rd Baron King (1709–1754)
- William King, 4th Baron King (1711–1767)
- Thomas King, 5th Baron King (1712–1779)
- Peter King, 6th Baron King (1736–1793)
- Peter King, 7th Baron King (1776–1833)
- William King, 8th Baron King (1805–1893) (created Earl of Lovelace in 1838)

== Earls of Lovelace (1838) ==
- William King-Noel, 1st Earl of Lovelace (1805–1893)
  - Byron King-Noel, Viscount Ockham (1836–1862), his eldest son; also 12th Baron Wentworth
- Ralph King-Milbanke, 2nd Earl of Lovelace (1839–1906), his younger brother; also 13th Baron Wentworth, in which he was succeeded by his only daughter
- Major Lionel King, 3rd Earl of Lovelace (1865–1929), his younger half-brother
- Peter King, 4th Earl of Lovelace (1905–1964), his only son
- Peter King, 5th Earl of Lovelace (1951–2018), his only child

== Notable family members ==
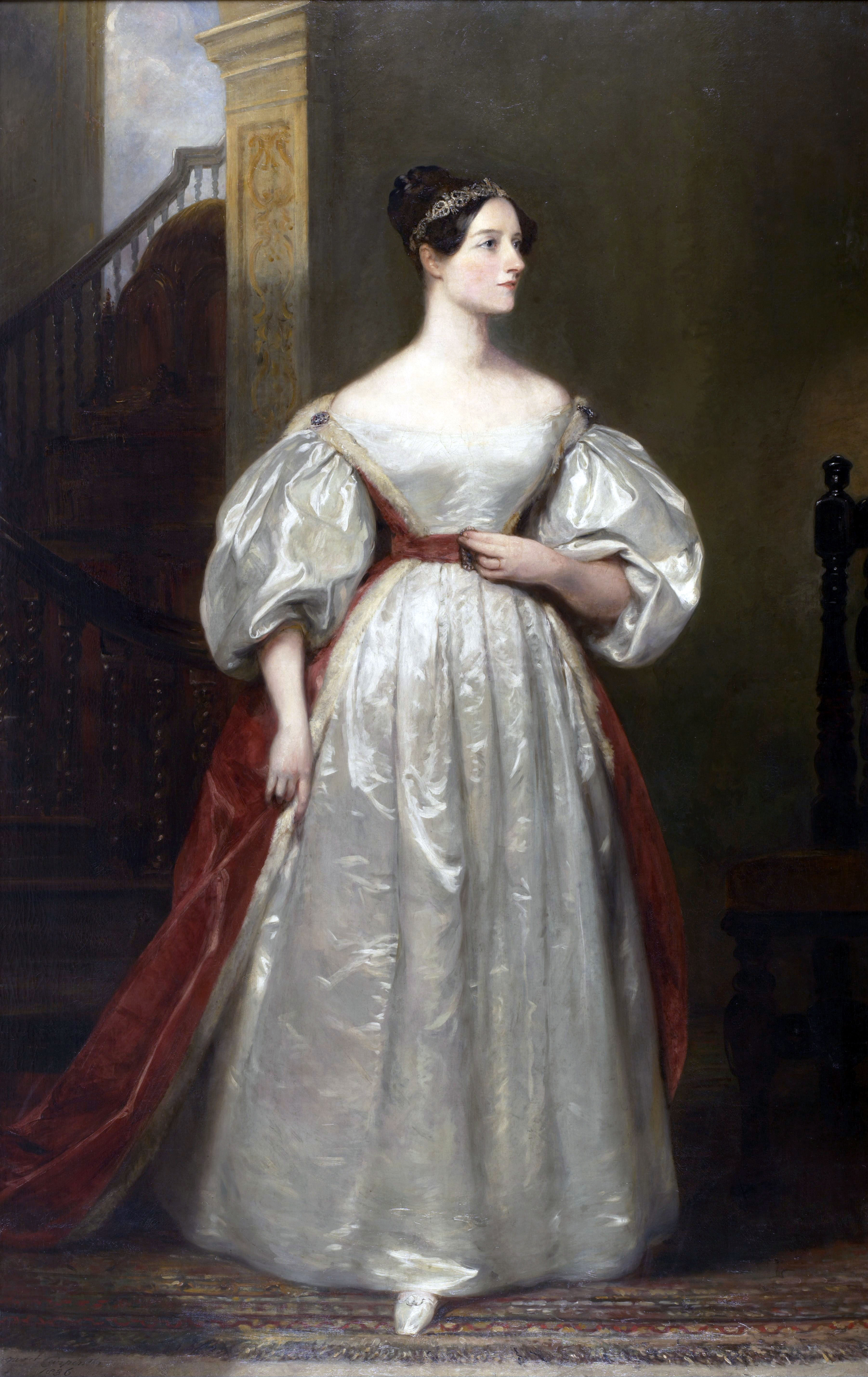
Portrait of Ada Lovelace by British painter Margaret Sarah Carpenter (1836)

=== Notable wives ===
Ada Lovelace, the first Earl's first wife, was an English mathematician and writer chiefly known for her work on Charles Babbage's early mechanical general-purpose computer, the Analytical Engine. Her notes on the engine include what is recognised as the first algorithm intended to be processed by a machine. Because of this, she is often described as the world's first computer programmer.

=== Notable younger sons and their sons ===
The Hon. Peter King, second son of the seventh Lord King (and brother of the first Earl of Lovelace), was a long-serving progressive politician who bought Brooklands and the father of Hugh F. Locke King, the entrepreneur who transformed it into a pioneering racetrack and aviation centre from the year 1906 onwards.

The family had no male heirs, nor female who married a celebrity. Hugh died without children in 1926 and his elder brother Peter died in middle age in 1885 in Aston without sons. Hugh's large Brooklands estate became Brooklands College, Brooklands Museum, a hotel, Mercedes Benz World, paths through greens, skateboarding and playground spaces and Brooklands distribution/retail park. A small part has become housing, having addresses with motor history names.

== Descendants of the 1st Earl of Lovelace ==
- William King-Noel, 1st Earl of Lovelace né King (1805–1893) ∞ Hon. Ada Augusta Byron née Noel (1815–1852) (1) ∞ Jane Crawford Jenkins (2)
  - Byron King-Noel, Viscount Ockham (1836–1862), also 12th Baron Wentworth (1860–1862), deserted Royal Navy
  - Anne Isabella Noel King-Noel (1837–1917), de jure 15th Baroness Wentworth ∞ Wilfred Scawen Blunt, poet
    - Judith Anne Dorothea Blunt-Lytton, 16th Baroness Wentworth (1873-1957) ∞ Neville Stephen Bulwer-Lytton, 3rd Earl of Lytton (1879–1951), see Earl of Lytton for her title's current vesting into Earldom
      - Noel Anthony Scawen Lytton, 4th Earl of Lytton and 17th Baron Wentworth (1900–1985) ∞ Clarissa Palmer
        - Lady Caroline Mary Noel Lytton (1947–2017)
        - John Peter Michael Scawen Lytton, 5th Earl of Lytton and 18th Baron Wentworth (b. 1950) ∞ Ursula Alexandra Komoly
        - Hon. (Thomas) Roland Cyril Lawrence Lytton (b. 1954)
        - Lady Lucy Mary Frances Lytton (b. 1957)
        - Lady Sarah Teresa Mary Lytton (b. 1959)
      - Lady Anne Lytton (1901–1979)
      - Lady Winifred Lytton (b.1904–1985) ∞ Claude Tryon
  - Ralph Gordon Noel King, 2nd Earl of Lovelace, 13th Baron Wentworth - extended Noel King name twice (1839–1906) ∞ Fannie Heriot d. 1878 (1) ∞ Mary Caroline Stuart-Wortley (2)
    - Lady Ada Mary King-Milbanke, 14th Baroness Wentworth (1871–1917)
  - Major Lionel Fortescue King, 3rd Earl of Lovelace (1865–1929) DSO (son by second marriage) ∞ Lady Edith Anson
    - Peter Malcolm King, 4th Earl of Lovelace (1905–1964) ∞ Doris Evison (1) died 1940 ∞ Lis Manon Transö (2)
      - Peter Axel William Locke King, 5th Earl of Lovelace (1951–2018)
    - Lady Evelyn Catherine King (1896–1974) ∞ Maj.-Gen. Sir Miles Graham, divorced 1930 (1) ∞ Mark Patrick (2) and had issue
    - Lady Phyllis Edith King (1897–1947) ∞ William Allen, divorced 1932 and had issue
    - Lady Rosemary Diana King (1902–1955) ∞ Lt.-Col. Alistair Gibb, divorced 1940 (1) ∞ Martin de Hosszu (2)
