= Ada Byron Milbanke, 14th Baroness Wentworth =

British peer (1871–1917)

Ada Byron Milbanke, 14th Baroness Wentworth (26 February 1871 – 18 June 1917) was a British peer.

Ada Byron Milbanke was the only acknowledged child of the Right Honourable Ralph Milbanke, Baron Wentworth and later Earl of Lovelace, the grandson of the poet Lord Byron, and his first wife Fannie Heriot. She was named after her paternal grandmother, Ada, Countess of Lovelace, mathematician and pioneer of computer programming.

Ada's parents separated shortly after her birth and her father petitioned for divorce on the grounds of her mother's adultery, although this was rejected in 1873. Ada's mother died in 1878. Ada was raised by her paternal aunt, Lady Anne (King) Blunt, co-owner of the internationally influential Crabbet Arabian Stud, a horse-breeding establishment with farms in the south of England and near Cairo, Egypt.

On the death of her father in 1906, Ada inherited the Barony of Wentworth of Nettlestead. She died unmarried and childless in 1917 and the title then passed to her aforementioned aunt, Lady Anne.

== Notes ==
Peerage of England
Preceded by Ralph (King) Milbanke	Baroness Wentworth; 1906–1917	Succeeded by Anne (King) Blunt
