= Peter King, 5th Earl of Lovelace =

British peer (1951–2018)

The Right Honourable The Earl of Lovelace
- Born: 26 November 1951
- Died: 5 February 2018 (aged 66)

Peter Axel William Locke King, 5th Earl of Lovelace (26 November 1951 – 5 February 2018), styled Viscount Ockham before 1964, was a British peer.

Lovelace succeeded his father, Peter King, 4th Earl of Lovelace, in 1964.

He lived in the Highlands of Scotland, for many years in the family home Torridon House and later in Inverness. He was married twice: first, to Kirsteen Oihrig Kennedy in 1980; they were divorced in 1989. He married Kathleen Anne Rose Smolders in 1994. He sold house items for £800,000 as well as the Torridon house in 2015.

Upon his death without issue in 2018, his titles of Earl of Lovelace, Viscount Ockham and Baron King, of Ockham became extinct.

== Arms ==
Coat of arms of Peter King, 5th Earl of Lovelace
Coronet A Coronet of an Earl Crest A Cubit Arm vested Azure charged with three Ermine Spots in fess Or cuffed Argent grasping in the Hand proper the broken shaft of a Spear in bend sinister Sable Escutcheon Sable three Spear Heads Argent imbrued proper on a Chief Or as many Battle-axes Azure Supporters On either side a Mastiff Dog reguardant proper collared Gules Motto Labor Ipse Voluptas (Labour itself is a pleasure)

Peerage of the United Kingdom
Preceded by Peter Malcolm King	Earl of Lovelace; 1964–2018	Extinct
