= Byron King-Noel, Viscount Ockham =

British peer and naval officer (1836–1862)

Byron King-Noel, 12th Baron Wentworth, styled Viscount Ockham (12 May 1836 – 1 September 1862) was a British peer, the first son of computing pioneer Ada Lovelace, and the eldest of the three legitimate grandchildren of poet Lord Byron.

== Early life ==
Lord Ockham was the eldest son of William King-Noel, 1st Earl of Lovelace and his wife, Ada Lovelace, the world's first computer programmer. His maternal grandparents were the poet Lord Byron and Annabella Byron, 11th Baroness Wentworth. He gained the rank of officer in the service of the Royal Navy, although he deserted, worked his passage back to Britain and became a shipyard worker – probably working for the Blyth shipping chandlers (Limehouse).

== Death ==
As his mother predeceased her own mother, he inherited the barony of Wentworth from his grandmother, but two years later died unmarried and childless at the age of 26, and his barony passed to his brother, Ralph, who was then styled Viscount Ockham and later inherited the earldom.

Peerage of England
Preceded by Anne Noel-Byron	Baron Wentworth; 1860–1862	Succeeded by Ralph King-Milbanke
