= Lady Byron =

English educational reformer and philanthropist (1792–1860)

The Right Honourable The Baroness Wentworth
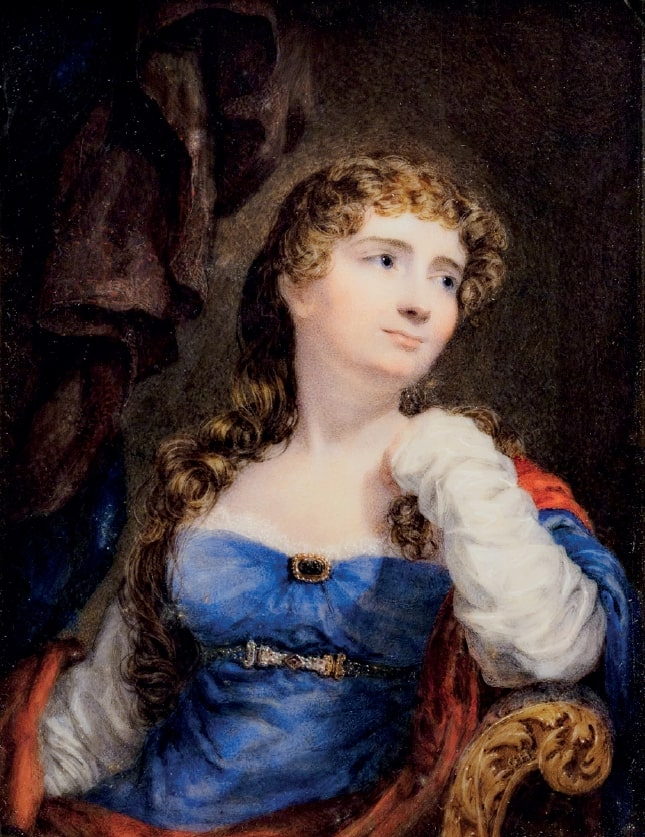
- 1812 portrait
- Born: Anne Isabella Milbanke; 17 May 1792; Elemore Hall, County Durham, England
- Died: 16 May 1860 (aged 67)
- Resting place: Kensal Green Cemetery
- Title: Baroness Wentworth
- Spouse: George Byron, 6th Baron Byron (m. 1815; died 1824)
- Children: Ada King, Countess of Lovelace
- Parent(s): Sir Ralph Milbanke, 6th Bt. Hon. Judith Noel

Anne Isabella Noel Byron, 11th Baroness Wentworth and Baroness Byron (née Milbanke; 17 May 1792 – 16 May 1860), nicknamed Annabella and commonly known as Lady Byron, was an educational reformer and philanthropist who established Ealing Grove School, possibly the first co-operative school in England, and was an active abolitionist. She married the poet George Gordon Byron, more commonly known as Lord Byron, and separated from him after less than a year, keeping their daughter Ada, later Ada Lovelace, in her custody despite laws at the time giving fathers sole custody of children.

Lady Byron's reminiscences, published after her death by Harriet Beecher Stowe, revealed her fears about alleged incest between Lord Byron and his half-sister, Augusta Leigh. The scandal about Lady Byron's suspicions accelerated Byron's intentions to leave England and return to the Mediterranean where he had lived in 1810. Lady Byron and her marriage were possible sources of inspiration for the character of Helen Graham and the plot of "The Tenant of Wildfell Hall" by Anne Bronte.

The Byrons' daughter, Ada Lovelace, worked as a mathematician with Charles Babbage, the pioneer of computer science, and is known as the first programmer.

== Names and family ==
Lady Byron was born Anne Isabella Milbanke, the only child of Sir Ralph Milbanke, 6th Baronet, and his wife, the Hon. Judith Noel, sister of Thomas Noel, Viscount Wentworth.

Her father's only surviving sibling was Elizabeth Lamb, Viscountess Melbourne, the influential political hostess. Her children, Anne's cousins, were:

- Hon. Peniston Lamb (1770–1805)
- William Lamb, 2nd Viscount Melbourne (1779–1848)
- Frederick Lamb, 3rd Viscount Melbourne (1782–1853)
- Hon. George Lamb (1784–1834)
- Emily Lamb, Countess Cowper (1787–1869)
- Harriet Lamb (1789–1803)

Her mother's only surviving sibling had no legitimate heirs, but he did have one son before his marriage, named after him, Thomas Noel; he became a clergyman.

When Anne's maternal uncle died, a few months after her marriage to Lord Byron, Lady Milbanke and her cousin Lord Scarsdale jointly inherited his estate. The family subsequently took the surname Noel over Milbanke.

Lord Wentworth had been both a viscount and a baron. Upon his death the viscountcy became extinct, and the barony fell into abeyance between Lady Milbanke and Lord Scarsdale. After their deaths the barony passed to Lady Byron and she became Baroness Wentworth in her own right; however she did not use the title. She signed her letters "A. I. Noel Byron" and her will as "Baroness Noel-Byron". The world knew her as "Lady Byron", and her friends and family called her by her nickname, "Annabella".

== Youth ==
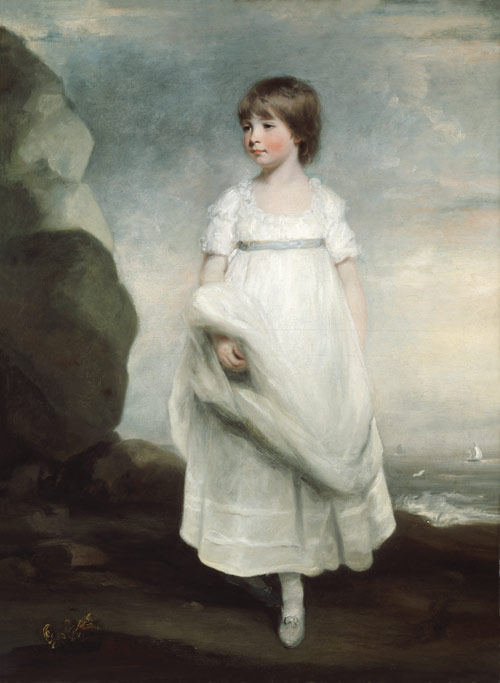
Portrait of Anne Isabella Milbanke by John Hoppner, 1800

She was a gifted child. To cultivate her obvious intelligence, her parents hired as her tutor a former Cambridge University professor by the name of William Frend. Under his direction, her education proceeded much like that of a Cambridge student; her studies involved classical literature, philosophy, science and mathematics, in which she particularly delighted. This fascination led her husband to nickname her his "princess of parallelograms".

Annabella developed into a stiff, religious woman with strict morals. She was aware of her strong intellect and was not ashamed to demonstrate it in her social realm. Often described as cold and prim, she seemed an unlikely match for the man who would become her ultimate obsession, the dramatically dark and "morally fractured" poet Lord Byron. Their first meeting occurred in March 1812. She later said to her mother that though she would not venture to introduce herself to Lord Byron, she would certainly accept his introduction if it were offered.

Byron's popularity was soaring following the success of his work Childe Harold's Pilgrimage. Annabella met him on many social occasions as he began a relationship with Lady Caroline Lamb, the wife of her cousin, William Lamb. However, Byron was attracted to her modesty and intellect and in October 1812 he proposed marriage through her aunt, the well-connected political hostess Elizabeth Lamb, Viscountess Melbourne. In response, she wrote a summary of his character and three days later refused him. However, they were plagued with a persistent interest in each other.

Although well aware of Byron's shortcomings, telling her mother "He is a very bad, very good man", she decided it was her religious obligation to support him and improve his behaviour. In August 1813, she contacted him in writing for the first time. The letters continued into the next year, some offering reassurance and support during times when public opinion of him was not favorable, others describing the "imperfect attachment" she felt for him. During this time, he accepted an invitation from Sir Ralph Milbanke to visit Seaham Hall, the family home in County Durham.

== Marriage ==
When George Gordon Byron proposed a second time, in September 1814, she did accept. The couple were married privately, and by special licence, at Seaham Hall in County Durham on 2 January 1815. The officiating clergyman was her cousin, the Rev. Thomas Noel of Kirkby Mallory, illegitimate son of her uncle, Viscount Wentworth. The couple lived at Piccadilly Terrace in London.

Byron was then in extreme financial distress. He rejected payments offered for his written works, as he believed business was not appropriate for a gentleman, and gave copyrights to people who had helped him. He was having difficulty selling his estates at Newstead Abbey and Rochdale to clear his debt. During the summer of 1815 he began to unleash his anger and hostility on his wife. His moods were dark and he began to drink heavily. In a letter to his half-sister, Augusta Leigh, he stated his suspicions that his wife had broken the lock on his desk and searched it. Later that year he began an affair with Susan Boyce, a London actress at Drury Lane Theatre, where he was a director.

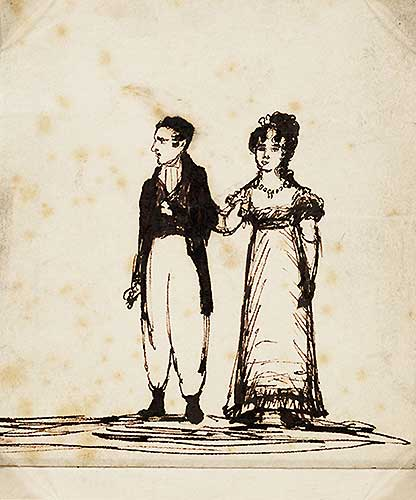
A sketch of Lord and Lady Byron by Lord Byron's scorned ex-lover, Lady Caroline Lamb

Annabella became increasingly upset. In the late stages of pregnancy, she feared her husband might be going mad. In November 1815 she wrote to Augusta and told her of Byron's moods and behaviour. In answer to her sister-in-law's letter, Augusta travelled to the Byrons' home to assist. Upon her arrival she became the subject of Byron's wrath and believed him to be temporarily insane. On 10 December Annabella gave birth to the couple's only child, a daughter whom they named Ada. Byron's despair seemed to increase.

== Separation ==
In January 1816, as the Byrons passed their first anniversary, Byron decided they must move from the rented house at Piccadilly Terrace. He recommended that Annabella take their daughter to her parents' home and stay there temporarily until he settled their finances. In disbelief, Annabella sought medical advice, as she had become convinced her husband had gone mad. She invited a physician to their home to assess him; Byron was unaware of the true purpose for the visit. The doctor recommended she do as Byron requested and move to her parents' estate.

Annabella began a detailed documentation of her husband's behaviour, moods and speech. She contacted his solicitor and friend, John Hanson, and told him her concern that her husband would take his life. She also provided Hanson with a pamphlet on hydrocephalus, accompanied by notes that suggested Byron could have this particular condition. Following this conversation, she took Ada and travelled to her parents' residence at Kirkby Mallory in Leicestershire. She would not see her husband again.

== Educational reformist and abolitionist ==
Lady Byron is to the far right of this painting of the 1840 World Anti-Slavery Convention

Lady Byron committed herself to social causes, such as prison reform and the abolition of slavery. In furtherance of the latter, Lady Byron attended the 1840 World Anti-Slavery Convention, where she was one of the few women included in its commemorative painting.

Lady Byron lived in Ealing between around 1822 and 1840, and established Ealing Grove School.

== Daughter ==
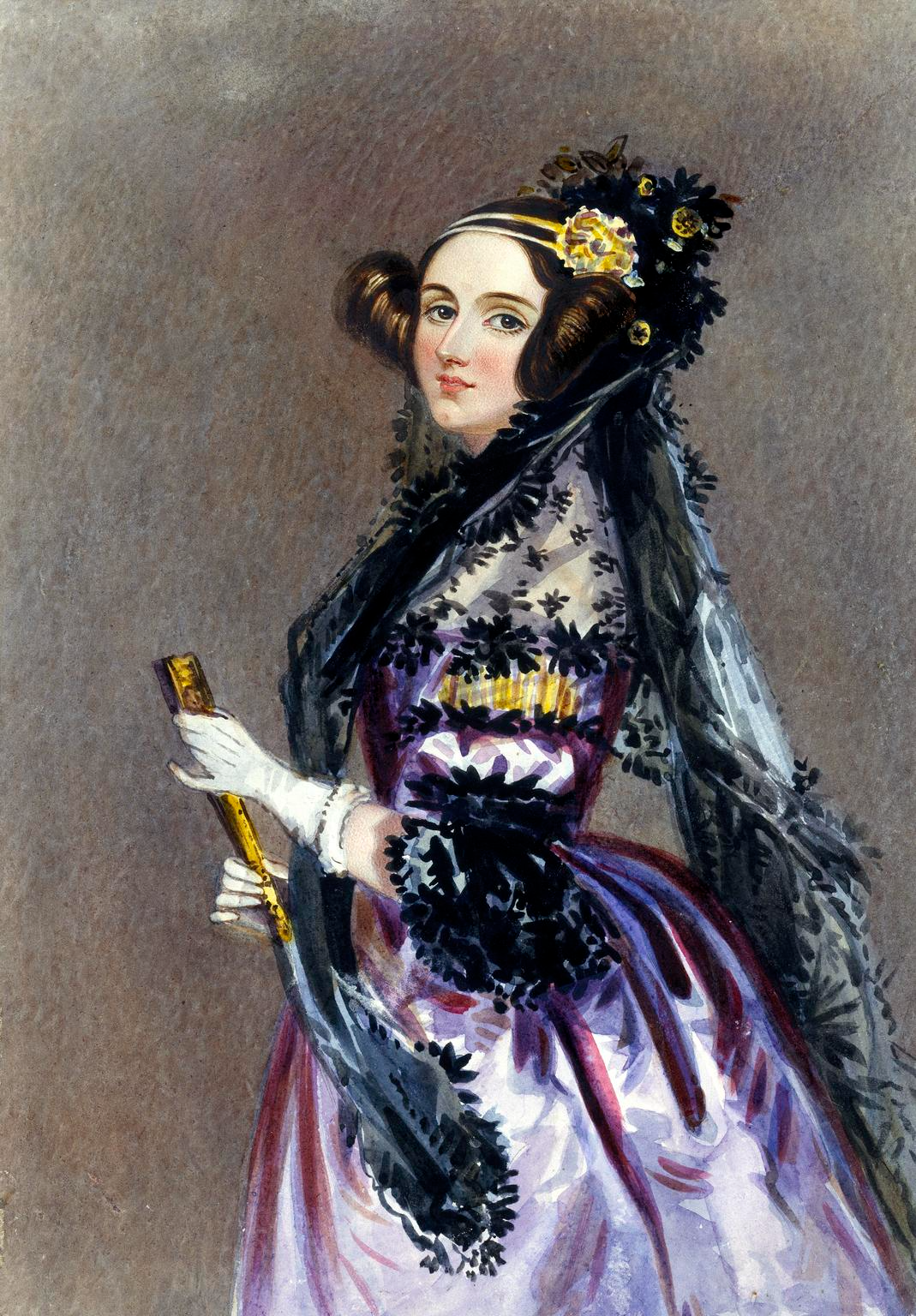
Watercolor, Ada Lovelace, possibly by A E Chalon (1780-1860),

As her daughter grew up, Lady Byron feared she might inherit her father's behaviours and dark moods. She schooled Ada in science and mathematics and discouraged literary study. Though her effort was great, it eventually seemed in vain: Ada Lovelace embodied many of her father's rebellious qualities. She is also considered to have been the world's first computer programmer, having written the first algorithm intended to be processed by a machine—Charles Babbage's analytical engine.

Ada married William, Lord King (who took the surname King-Noel), when she was 19. William was subsequently made the 1st Earl Lovelace, and the couple had three children, Byron King-Noel, Viscount Ockham and 12th Baron Wentworth; Anne Blunt, 15th Baroness Wentworth, who brought the Arabian horse to England; and Ralph King-Milbanke, 2nd Earl of Lovelace. Ada died from uterine cancer on 27 November 1852. Lady Byron attended her daughter's deathbed and, under her influence, Ada underwent a religious conversion. Ada was 36 years old when she died, the same age as Byron when he died.

== Later life ==
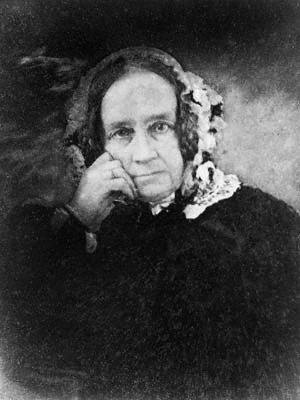
Lady Byron in later life

During her first month away from him, Annabella wrote to Byron affectionately, addressing him as "dearest Duck". Meanwhile, she and her parents sought legal counsel. Their lawyer recommended a legal separation and sent Byron a letter proposing the separation. Augusta Leigh, who had remained with Byron at Piccadilly Terrace since his wife's departure, intercepted the letter, as she feared he would commit suicide if he knew of it. She returned the letter to Kirkby Mallory and communicated her opinion that greater consideration should be taken in the matter of the Byrons' marriage. A week later, however, a messenger sent Lord Byron the proposal again.

This time it reached him, but he refused to believe that she no longer wanted to be married to him. He asked Mrs Leigh to write to her; in addition, he refused to dissolve their marriage. A short while later, when Lady Byron made clear her suspicions that his relationship with his half-sister Augusta Leigh was incestuous, that he had had homosexual relationships, and had sodomised her – Lady Byron – acts which were illegal, he changed his mind. He agreed to grant her request if she proved that the request for legal separation was truly hers and not that of her parents. In response, she personally communicated her feelings to Augusta. Byron kept his word, and their separation was made legal in March 1816, in a private settlement.

Following the settlement, Augusta wrote to Annabella; the latter's solicitor replied to the private note. Byron was enraged by such cold treatment of his half-sister. Soon after the dissolution of his marriage, he left England and lived the remainder of his days abroad. Though she wished to separate from her husband, Annabella was obsessed by him until her death. She was motivated to save his soul and secure him a place in Heaven. In the years following their separation, she came to believe that the time she had spent with him guaranteed he would experience God's embrace upon his death. She kept his letters, copies of her own to him, and letters about him. She carefully documented their relationship, supposedly in preparation for any challenge Lord Byron might make for custody of their daughter.

Byron never sought custody of Ada, though he sent for both of them shortly before his death in Greece on 19 April 1824.

== Death ==
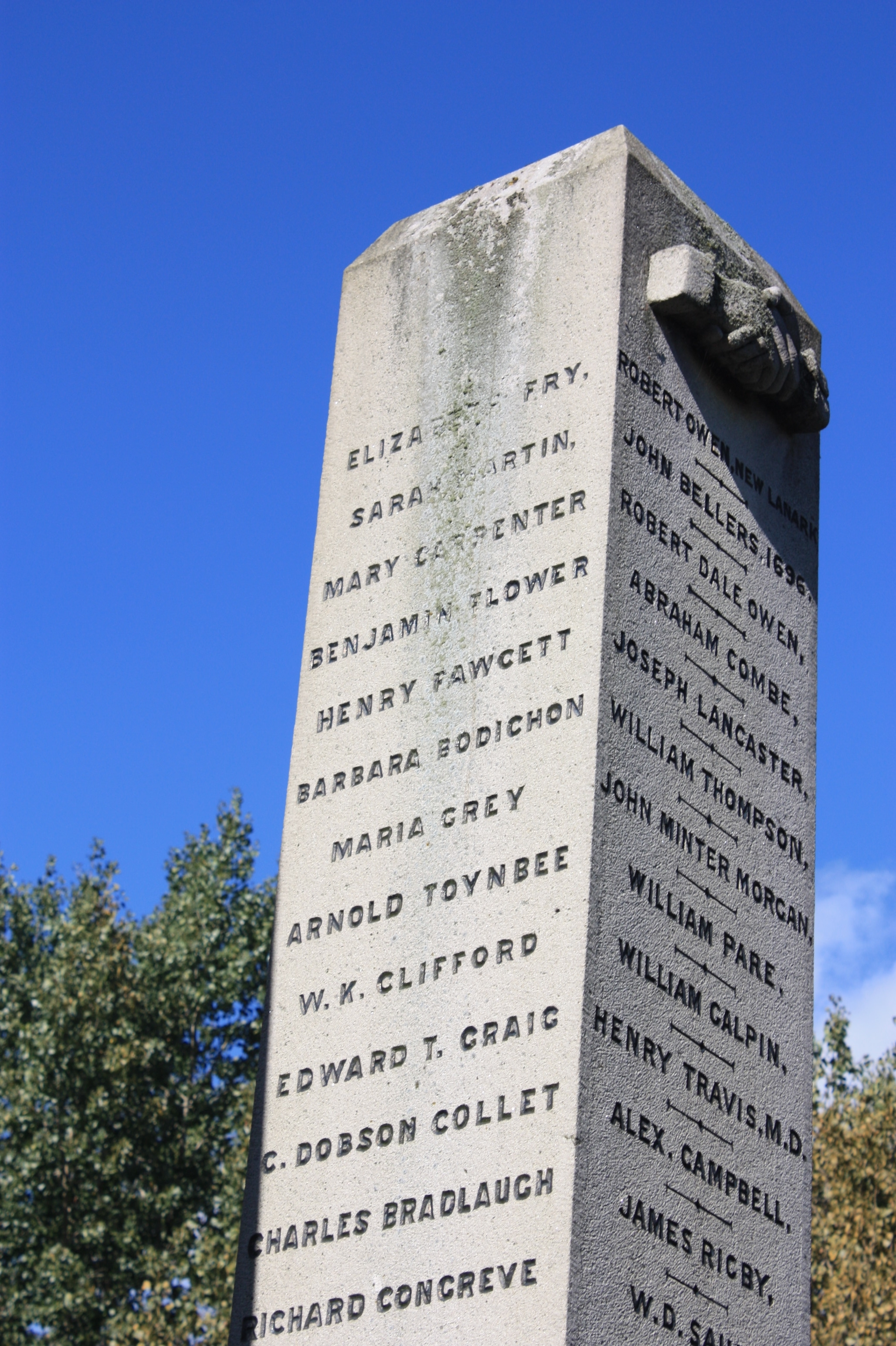
Anne is listed as Lady Noel Byron on the Reformers Monument, Kensal Green Cemetery

Lady Byron died of breast cancer on 16 May 1860, the day before her 68th birthday. She was buried in Kensal Green Cemetery at Kensal Green in London. Prior to her death, she shared the story of her marriage to Byron with Harriet Beecher Stowe, who encouraged her to remain silent. In 1869 Stowe published the account given to her, the first time anyone had publicly hinted at an incestuous relationship between Byron and his half-sister. Stowe was criticized for writing a supposedly "indecent" article and lost popularity. Initially biographers criticized Lady Byron as "small-minded;" more recent works have provided a fuller picture of her accomplishments.

Lady Byron's barony passed to her grandson Byron King-Noel, Viscount Ockham.

In her will she left a £300 legacy to the writer George MacDonald, whom she had patronized during her life.

Lady Byron Lane, off Knowle Road, Solihull, is named after her. Lady Byron was heiress of the Knowle estates through her father, Sir Ralph Milbanke Noel.

== Arms ==
Coat of arms of Lady Byron
Escutcheon Or fretty Gules a canton Ermine. Supporters Two griffins Argent collared Or.

== Bibliography ==
- Markus, Julia. Lady Byron and her Daughters. New York: Norton, 2015.
- Elwin, Malcolm, Lord Byron's Family: Annabella, Ada and Augusta, 1816-1824, London: John Murray, 1975.
- Elwin, Malcolm, Lord Byron's Wife, London: Macdonald, 1962.
- Elwin, Malcolm, The Noels and the Milbankes, London: Macdonald, 1967.
- Lodge, Edmund, Norroy King of Arms, The Peerage of the British Empire, London, 1858, p. 588, under 'Anne Isabella Noel-Byon, Baroness Wentworth of Nettlested.'

Peerage of England
Vacant Abeyant in 1815 Title last held by Thomas Noel	Baroness Wentworth; 1856–1860	Succeeded by Byron King-Noel
