= George Byng =

George Byng may refer to:

- George Byng (c. 1556–1616), MP for Rochester
- George Byng, 1st Viscount Torrington (1663–1733), Royal Navy officer and statesman
- George Byng, 3rd Viscount Torrington (1701–1750), British Army officer and peer
- George Byng (1735–1789), British Member of Parliament
- George Byng (1764–1847), British Member of Parliament, son of the above
- George Byng, 4th Viscount Torrington (1740–1812), English peer
- George Byng, 6th Viscount Torrington (1768–1831), Royal Navy officer
- George Byng, 2nd Earl of Strafford (1806–1886), British peer and politician
- George Byng, 7th Viscount Torrington (1812–1884), British colonial administrator and courtier
- George Byng, 3rd Earl of Strafford (1830–1898), British politician
- George Byng, 8th Viscount Torrington (1841–1889), British politician
- George Byng, 9th Viscount Torrington (1886–1944)
- George W. Byng (1861–1932), composer and conductor
