= Admiral Byng =

Admiral Byng may refer to:

- Admiral John Byng (1704–1757), British admiral, shot by sentence of a court martial
- Admiral George Byng, 1st Viscount Torrington (1663–1733), the first of several Viscounts Torrington
- Vice-Admiral George Byng, 6th Viscount Torrington

== See also ==
- Byng (disambiguation)
