= Byng =

Byng may refer to:

== Places ==
- Byng, Oklahoma, a small town in Pontotoc County
- Byng Inlet, Ontario, a ghost town in Parry Sound District
- Manor of Byng, Suffolk, England
- Byng, New South Wales, a locality in Central West region of New South Wales, Australia

== People ==
- Several Earls of Strafford, including:
  - Edmund Henry Byng, 6th Earl of Strafford (1861–1951), president of Middlesex County Cricket Club
- George Byng (disambiguation), one of several Viscounts Torrington, most notably:
  - George Byng, 1st Viscount Torrington (1663–1733), British Admiral and statesman
- Georgia Byng (born 1965), British author of children's books
- James Byng (born 1985), British actor
- James W. Byng, British botanist
- Jamie Byng (born 1969), Canongate Books publisher
- John Byng (disambiguation), several people with the same name, including:
  - John Byng (1704–1757), British admiral, sentenced to death by court martial and shot
- Julian Byng, 1st Viscount Byng of Vimy (1862–1935), British general during World War I, later Governor General of Canada and involved in the King-Byng constitutional crisis
- Thomas Byng (died 1599), English academic and lawyer

== Others ==
- Lady Byng Memorial Trophy, for sportsmanship in the National Hockey League
- Lord Byng Secondary School, Vancouver

== See also ==
- Bing (disambiguation)
