= John Byng, 5th Viscount Torrington =

English diarist

Colonel The Right Honourable The Viscount Torrington
- Byng arms: Quarterly sable and argent in the first quarter a lion rampant of the second
- Born: 18 February 1743; Southill, Bedfordshire, England
- Died: 8 January 1813 (aged 69); London, England
- Other name: The Hon. John Byng
- Education: Westminster
- Occupations: Army officer and civil servant
- Known for: Travel journals
- Title: Viscount Torrington; Baron Byng; Baronet, of Wrotham
- Political party: Whig
- Spouse: Bridget Forrest (d. 1823)
- Relatives: Earls of Strafford

John Byng, 5th Viscount Torrington (18 February 1743 – 8 January 1813), previously styled The Hon. John Byng for most of his lifetime (until 1812), was a British aristocrat and celebrated 18th-century diarist.

Byng's fifteen extant diaries, covering the years 1781–94, describe his travels on horseback throughout England and Wales during twelve summers.

== Family ==
The younger son of Major-General George Byng, 3rd Viscount Torrington, whose father Admiral of the Fleet Sir George Byng, KB, was created a baronet in 1715 before being elevated to the peerage as Viscount Torrington in 1721, his family were formerly seated at Southill Park in Bedfordshire. He was a great-uncle of the politician Lord John Russell and in 1847 his cousin, Field Marshal Sir John Byng, GCB, was created Earl of Strafford.

== Life ==
After attending Westminster School, Byng was commissioned in the Grenadier Guards, retiring as Colonel of the Regiment in 1780. On 14 December 1812 he succeeded his elder brother, George Byng, 4th Viscount Torrington, formerly HM Minister Plenipotentiary at Brussels, in the family titles but died before he had the opportunity of being introduced in the House of Lords. The paternal seat of Southill Park had been sold by his elder brother for the repayment of debt, and Byng thus found himself titled but landless.

== Marriage and progeny ==
On 3 March 1767 he married Bridget Forrest, daughter of Commodore Arthur Forrest and Frederica Marina Cecila Lynch, daughter of Colonel John Lynch.

Lord and Lady Torrington had 14 children, 13 of whom survived infancy:

=== Sons ===
- George Byng, 6th Viscount Torrington (5 January 1768 – 18 June 1831), eldest son and heir, who took his seat in the House of Lords on 3 February 1813. He married twice, firstly on 8 February 1793 to Elizabeth Langmead (d. 1810), daughter of Philip Langmead, MP, and secondly on 5 October 1811 to Frances Harriet Barlow (d. 1868), daughter of Admiral Sir Robert Barlow, GCB.
- The Hon. Edmund John Byng (11 September 1774 – 5 April 1854), Commissioner of the Colonial Audit Office.
- The Hon. John Byng (16 January 1777 – 23 November 1811), who on 5 November 1806 married Eliza Amelia Mayne.
- The Hon. Henry Dilkes Byng (22 September 1781 – 24 September 1860), Vice-Admiral RN, married on 2 October 1810 Maria Jane Clarke (d. 1874), daughter of the Hon. James Clarke and cousin of Sir Simon Haughton Clarke, Bt, whose great-great grandson, Major John Cranmer-Byng, MC, is currently heir presumptive to the viscountcy.
- The Hon. Frederick Gerald Finch Byng (4 December 1784 – 5 June 1871), known as Poodle Byng. A Regency society dandy who served as a Page of Honour to George, Prince of Wales, held commissions in the Army, before serving in the Foreign Office. In his later life he became actively involved in the campaign to improve sanitation in London.
- A stillborn child in 1794, sex not recorded.

=== Daughters ===
- The Hon. Elizabeth Lucy Byng (11 July 1769 – 18 January 1846), who married twice, firstly on 26 September 1797 to Rear-Admiral Percy Fraser, RN (1767–1827), and secondly on 10 August 1836 to the Revd George Goodenough Lynn (1809–89), Vicar of St John's Hampton Wick.
- The Hon. Cecilia Elizabeth Byng (15 August 1770 – July 1843), who on 31 October 1805 married Robert Gregge-Hopwood JP DL (1773–1854). They lived at Hopwood Hall, near Middleton, Lancashire, and were friends of the poet Lord Byron whose work Childe Harold's Pilgrimage was partly written while staying at Hopwood in 1811.
- The Hon. Anna Maria Bridget Byng (18 August 1771 – 30 October 1852), who on 29 August 1794 married the Very Revd Charles Henry Hall (1763–1827), an ecclesiastic who held several prominent posts in the Church of England.
- The Hon. Frances Byng (11 May 1773 – November 1796).
- The Hon. Bridget Augusta Forrest Byng (1779 – 4 March 1876), who on 9 July 1806 married Captain the Hon. Charles Herbert, RN (1774–1808).
- The Hon. Georgiana Byng (1786 – 23 July 1856), who in 1810 married the Revd Geoffrey Hornby (1780–1850), Rector of Bury, Lancashire.
- The Hon. Beatrice Charlotte Byng (15 January 1788 – 12 March 1848), who on 30 November 1820 married the Revd Colin Alexander Campbell (1792–1860), Rector of Widdington, Essex.
- The Hon. Lucy Juliana Byng (about 1790 – 27 November 1881), who on 5 October 1809 married Sir John Morris, Bt (1775–1855).

== Death and burial ==
Lord Torrington died in 1813 being buried in the Byng Mausoleum at the Church of All Saints in the parish of Southill in Bedfordshire.

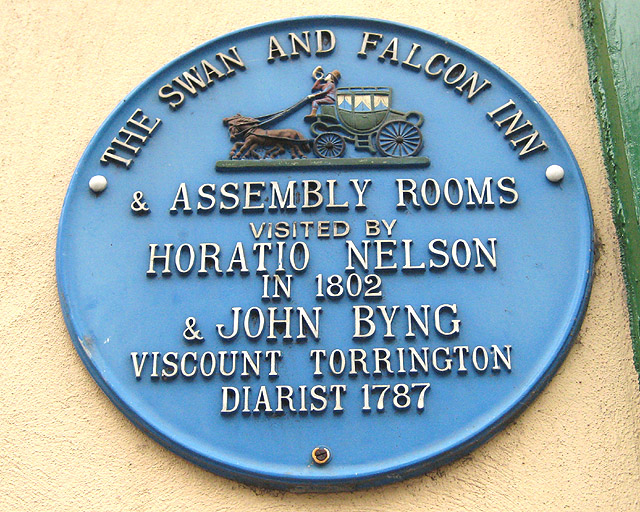
Commemorative plaque at Ross-on-Wye to the Viscounts Torrington and Nelson

== The Torrington Diaries ==
1. Tour to the West, [31 May – 14 July] 1781, Bodleian Library, Oxford (Travel Journals).
2. A Ride into the West, [23 August – 9 September] 1782, Hampshire Archives & Local Studies, Winchester (Diary of a Tour through Surrey, Hampshire and Dorset).
3. A Tour to North Wales, [25 June – 31 July] 1784, Cardiff Central Library.
4. A Ride taken in July, [2 – 12 July] 1785, Shakespeare Centre Library & Archive, Stratford-upon-Avon (Diary of a Tour through Oxfordshire and Warwickshire).
5. Of a Tour into South Wales, [21 July – 18 August] 1787, Cardiff Central Library.
6. Fragment of a diary of a Tour in Hertfordshire, (circa 11-circa 21) June 1788, Cambridge University Library (Torrington Diary, June 1788).
7. A Tour into Sussex, [15 – 25 August] 1788, Brighton & Hove Library Service (Diary of a Tour through Sussex).
8. A Tour in the Midlands, [9 June – 4 July] 1789, Bodleian Library, Oxford (Travel Journals).
9. Tour in the Midlands, [7 – 22 June 29 June – 20 July] 1790, Manchester Archives & Local Studies (Diary of Tours from Leicester to Manchester & through the East Midlands).
10. A Tour into Bedfordshire, [21 August – 5 September] 1790, Luton Central Library.
11. A Tour into Kent, [17 – 26 September] 1790, in private hands.
12. A Tour into Lincolnshire, [13 June – 27 July] 1791, Lincoln Central Library (Diary of a Tour of Lincolnshire).
13. A Tour to the North, [27 May – 17 July] 1792, Bodleian Library, Oxford (Travel Journals).
14. Tour into North Wales, [9 July – 20 August] 1793, Cardiff Central Library.
15. A Tour in Bedfordshire, [1 May – 13 June 6 – 28 September] 1794, Luton Central Library.

The historian Donald Adamson believes there to be a missing diary of Byng's tour of Devon.

== Scope of his work ==
Byng's journeys encompass England and Wales in the summer months of 1781–1794. After this time he gave up his journeyings, feeling he was too old to cover so many miles on horseback with only a servant to accompany him and sometimes to ride on ahead to book the inn for the next night's stay. This servant, who was the person variously of Thomas Bush, Garwood, young Thomas Bush or an unlikeable unnamed valet, had the duties of carrying his master's bedclothes on his own horse, making his master's bed, attending to both horses, calling his master in the morning and "give him consequence". Viewed in a literary light, Bush or Garwood resembles Don Quixote's Sancho Panza.

Byng wrote no travel journal for Scotland though he may have been acquainted with that country. He travelled through the Midlands in 1774 without leaving any record of his impressions, returning there in 1789/90.

On his travels Byng displays the training and attitude of a retired Army officer (subsequently, from 1782 to 1799, a Commissioner of Stamps) together with the intellectual outlook of an antiquary steeped from his schooldays in Shakespeare and in the classics of Greek and Roman antiquity. He delights in ruins, such as those of Tintern Abbey, Crowland Abbey and Fountains Abbey, studies gravestones in many or most of the churches he visits, and records the inscriptions on some of them. He makes detours to view historic mansions while taking care not to stay at any of them even when they are inhabited by his aristocratic relations. He does not, for example, enter Woburn Abbey although it is the home of his niece's brother-in-law, the future 6th Duke of Bedford. Nor does he stay with his brother the 4th Viscount Torrington but rather at the Sun Inn at Biggleswade in Bedfordshire, which he calls his "country seat".

In keeping with his military training Byng is gifted with his pencil. Like Turner in the Lake District, he uses his paintbrushes to sketch charming but somewhat naïve watercolour scenes, for example of Barfreston Church in Kent, Greta Bridge or the "tortur'd tree" at Bell Bar.

Like Horace Walpole or William Thomas Beckford, he admired Gothic architecture, thus foreshadowing the Romantic movement. (It is the attitude satirised by Jane Austen in Northanger Abbey). He deplores any "ugly, staring, red-brick house", such as Dunham Massey, Adlington Hall, Etruria Hall or Attingham Park in North West England. And yet, as befits a former Army officer, he admires orderliness and the well-kept economy of a flourishing country estate.

There is a vividness and an immediacy about Byng's documentary record which is seldom if ever to be found in the work of any other British diarist.

== Byng's picture of 18th-century society ==
Byng is a laudator temporis acti, or "praiser of times past". As a Whig he looked favourably on the Hanoverian settlement and expressed a strong dislike for Scotland. He lamented that Scotland seemed to be taking over England: “like their native thistles, they never can be weeded out”. He was a countryman at heart, far happier fishing and shooting than endeavouring to adapt himself to the airs and graces of polite London society, for which he had little affection. He fondly recollects his visits to Yotes Court, Maidstone in about 1755. Yet emotionally he was rooted in Bedfordshire, the county of his childhood.

Faithful to the established Church of England (although conscious of its imperfections), he had only limited sympathy with Methodism – while recognising its potential to rejuvenate traditional churchgoing.

He was aware that great social changes were afoot and did not totally disapprove of them. Concerning the new industries, he was full of admiration for Cromford Mill in Derbyshire, and for the pioneering technology of Richard Arkwright. He admired the silk-mills at Overton near Basingstoke, the mining and the navigation tunnel at Sapperton in Gloucestershire, and Josiah Wedgwood's potteries at Etruria, Staffordshire. But this was the picturesque side. Of the Derbyshire mills he writes: “These cotton mills, seven storeys high and fill'd with inhabitants, remind me of a first-rate man of war and, when they are lighted up on a dark night, look most luminously beautiful". Politically, however, he dreaded revolution or even reform.

In the course of his journeyings Byng provides much information about the inns and alehouses of the time. Often included in his diaries are the bills he has paid at his various stopping-places. Partly because they were so often on his routes, there were four inns he especially liked: the Sun at Biggleswade, the Haycock at Wansford, the Ram's Head at Disley, and the Wheatsheaf at Alconbury (Hill). People travelled with their own bed-sheets, merely renting a bed at an inn in preference to sleeping in "damp house sheets". At Leicester the diarist's bed was "sheeted, contrary to [his] orders". A rushlight would faintly illuminate his bedroom during the hours of darkness.

Byng rose early in the morning and sometimes breakfasted as late as nine. Broadly speaking, dinner (lunch) was at two o’clock. However, it could be called for as late as four. Supper could be at any time between seven and nine o'clock. At both meals there was sometimes a fairly wide range of dishes. The breakfast drink was usually coffee. The food was standard fare, with recipes that were fairly identical in whichever part of the country Byng happened to be. Breakfast costed 10 pence, dinner was 1 shilling 6 pence or 2 shillings, and supper 1 shilling: at Boston, Lincolnshire it is called a "gentleman's supper", at 1/9d. Wine, the cost varying with the quantity consumed, was an additional charge. Also additional were the horses' hay and corn, which generally cost 3/6d to 4/-.

The quality of inn fare varied enormously. At Bedford Byng lifted the lid of a damson tart and decided not to have any of it – plastering it down "for the next comer", and adding caustically that "it was not the first time of the lids being removed". A good "pigeon-pie, with a pint of good port wine" was one of his favourite collations. James Burnett, Lord Monboddo, had for "supper ... a provincial dish, cook'd from his directions".

At the Sun Inn at Biggleswade Byng had not only his own parlour, where he could eat privately, but was also provided with his own lockable chest of drawers (complete with "nightcap, shirts, fishing-tackle") and with grazing for his horse while he was in London. Though at Broadway, Worcestershire he enjoyed the luxury of a "spacious and clean parlour", he was often in the "public parlours"; and this was all the more remarkable because of the great disparity which then existed between the grand bedrooms and dining-rooms of historic houses and the cold, draughty, ill-lit "gallery chamber[s]" where he so frequently had to spend the night. In the era of inns and alehouses, hotels had scarcely come into existence (though there was one at Buxton and in Manchester there was the Bridgewater Arms Hotel. The bedrooms in these inns and alehouses could be very primitive indeed. There might be "dirty blankets" (25 August 1782). At Settle his "windows, door and chimney board kept an incessant clatter". A traveller, or tourist, might even be made to share a servants' bedroom. At Lewes Byng and Isaac Dalby had to share a double bed. On the more positive side, it was sometimes possible to have supper served in one's bedroom.

On his travels Byng met up with, or glimpsed, many of the prominent people of his age. In August 1788 he undertook a tour into Sussex with the mathematician Isaac Dalby. At Biggleswade, in 1792, he met Humphry Repton. At Birmingham, in the same year, he encountered Sarah Siddons. Two years later, at Ampthill, he glimpsed Lord Monboddo travelling post-haste from London to Edinburgh. Byng leaves unforgettable memories of Blenheim Palace (its grounds, gardens and gardeners but not of the Duke of Marlborough himself). His meeting with Colonel Johnson, told with economy, lingers in the imagination.

The overall impression is that of a man keenly aware of social change: that is Byng's head; but in his heart he yearns for the old ways.

== Purpose of his work ==
In England and Wales Byng set out, year after year, on his own sort of Grand Tour. The Grand Tour, a leisurely exploration of outstanding cultural features of the European Continent, was undertaken by many young men—though not by Byng himself—before and during the 1780s. Byng, intensely patriotic, believed that there was just as much of interest in Britain as in France or Italy, particularly as England and Wales contained so much that was picturesque.

He writes in his Fragment of a diary of a Tour in Hertfordshire, June 1788:-

"Now I should be glad to ask of our Travellers, who brag of every country but their own, where they will find a cheaper charge than this [18/3d for 2½ days]; which was on a high road, [at South Mimms,] near the metropolis of Europe!"

"Talk not, therefore, gentlemen, of foreign parts, till you have seen and learnt something of your own country: – ye, who drive by Canterbury Cathedral, without deigning a look, and return boasting of rialtos, eclipsed by the work of the most ordinary Welsh masons."

“If my journals should remain legible, or be perused at the end of 200 years", he writes elsewhere, "there will, even then, be little curious in them relative to travel, or the people; because our island is now so explored; our roads, in general, are so fine; and our speed has reach'd the summit".

But it is impossible to agree with his assessment that The Torrington Diaries or Rides Round Britain have no enduring historical value. Like Samuel Pepys, Byng conveys a most vivid impression of what it was like for the diarist to live from day to day in the society of his own period.

=== Arms ===
Coat of arms of John Byng, 5th Viscount Torrington
Coronet That of a viscount. Crest An heraldic antelope ermine. Escutcheon Quarterly, sable and argent, in the 1st quarter a lion rampant of the second. Supporters Dexter, an heraldic antelope ermine, armed, unguled, maned and tufted or, standing on a ship’s gun proper; sinister, a sea-horse also proper also on a ship’s gun. Motto Tuebor (I will defend).

== See also ==
- Earl of Strafford

Peerage of Great Britain
Preceded by George Byng	Viscount Torrington; 1812–1813	Succeeded by George Byng
Baronetage of Great Britain
Preceded by George Byng	Baronet (of Wrotham); 1812–1813	Succeeded by George Byng
