= Charlotte Byng, Viscountess Torrington =

British noblewoman

- Born: 1705
- Died: 17 February 1759 (aged 53–54); London, England
- Spouse: Pattee Byng (m. 1724; died 1747)
- Children: 2
- Father: Charles Montagu

Charlotte Byng, Viscountess Torrington (1705 – 17 February 1759), formerly Lady Charlotte Montagu, was the wife of Pattee Byng, 2nd Viscount Torrington. She was the daughter of Charles Montagu, 1st Duke of Manchester, and his wife, the former Doddington Greville. She married Viscount Torrington on 11 June 1724.

The couple had two sons, neither of whom survived their father: George (1728–1730) and Frederick (1735–1736). On the viscount's death, his title passed to his brother, George Byng, 3rd Viscount Torrington.

The viscountess was a Lady of the Bedchamber to Augusta of Saxe-Gotha, Princess of Wales, from 1736 to 1739 and again from 1742 to 1759. She died in her fifties, in London, and was buried in the Byng family vault at All Saints Church, Southill, Bedfordshire.
