= General Byng =

General Byng may refer to:

- George Byng, 3rd Viscount Torrington (1701–1750), British Army major general
- John Byng, 1st Earl of Strafford (1772–1860), British Army general
- Julian Byng, 1st Viscount Byng of Vimy (1862–1935), British Army general
