= George Byng, 8th Viscount Torrington =

British Conservative politician

Arms of Byng: Quarterly sable and argent in the first quarter a lion rampant of the second

George Stanley Byng, 8th Viscount Torrington (29 April 1841 – 20 October 1889), known as George Byng until 1884, was a British Conservative politician.

== Origins ==
He was the son of Major the Hon. Robert Barlow Palmer Byng (third son of George Byng, 6th Viscount Torrington), by his wife Elizabeth Maria Gwatkin, a daughter of Major-General Edward Gwatkin, a son of Robert Lovell Gwatkin.

== Career ==
In 1884 he succeeded his uncle George Byng, 7th Viscount Torrington (1812-1884) in the viscountcy. In 1888 his uncle's companion, Andalusia Molesworth died. She left her fortune to Byng as she was estranged from her ex-husband's family.

Byng served briefly as a Lord-in-waiting (government whip in the House of Lords) from March to October 1889 in the Conservative administration of Lord Salisbury.

== Marriages and children ==
He married twice:

- Firstly in 1882 to Alice Arabella (d. 1883), a daughter of James Jameson.
- Secondly in 1885 to Emmeline Seymour (d. June 1912), a daughter of Rev. Henry Seymour, by whom he had children including:
  - George Master Byng, 9th Viscount Torrington (1886–1944).

== Death and succession ==
He died in office in October 1889, aged 48, and was succeeded in the viscountcy by his son from his second marriage, George Master Byng, 9th Viscount Torrington (1886–1944).

== Arms ==
Coat of arms of George Byng, 8th Viscount Torrington
| Coronet That of a viscount. Crest An heraldic antelope ermine. Escutcheon Quarterly, sable and argent, in the 1st quarter a lion rampant of the second. Supporters Dexter, an heraldic antelope ermine, armed, unguled, maned and tufted or, standing on a ship’s gun proper; sinister, a sea-horse also proper also on a ship’s gun. Motto Tuebor (I will defend). |

== Notes ==
Peerage of Great Britain
| Preceded by George Byng | Viscount Torrington; 1884–1889 | Succeeded by George Master Byng |
