= Philip Langmead =

British politician (c. 1739–1816)

Philip Langmead (c. 1739 – 8 August 1816) was Member of Parliament for Plymouth from 1802 to February 1806.

He was Mayor of Plymouth from 1800 to 1801.

He married Elizabeth Clark in c. 1763. His daughter Elizabeth was the first wife of George Byng, 6th Viscount Torrington.
