= Sir Thomas Maryon Wilson, 8th Baronet =

Landowner and thwarted urban developer

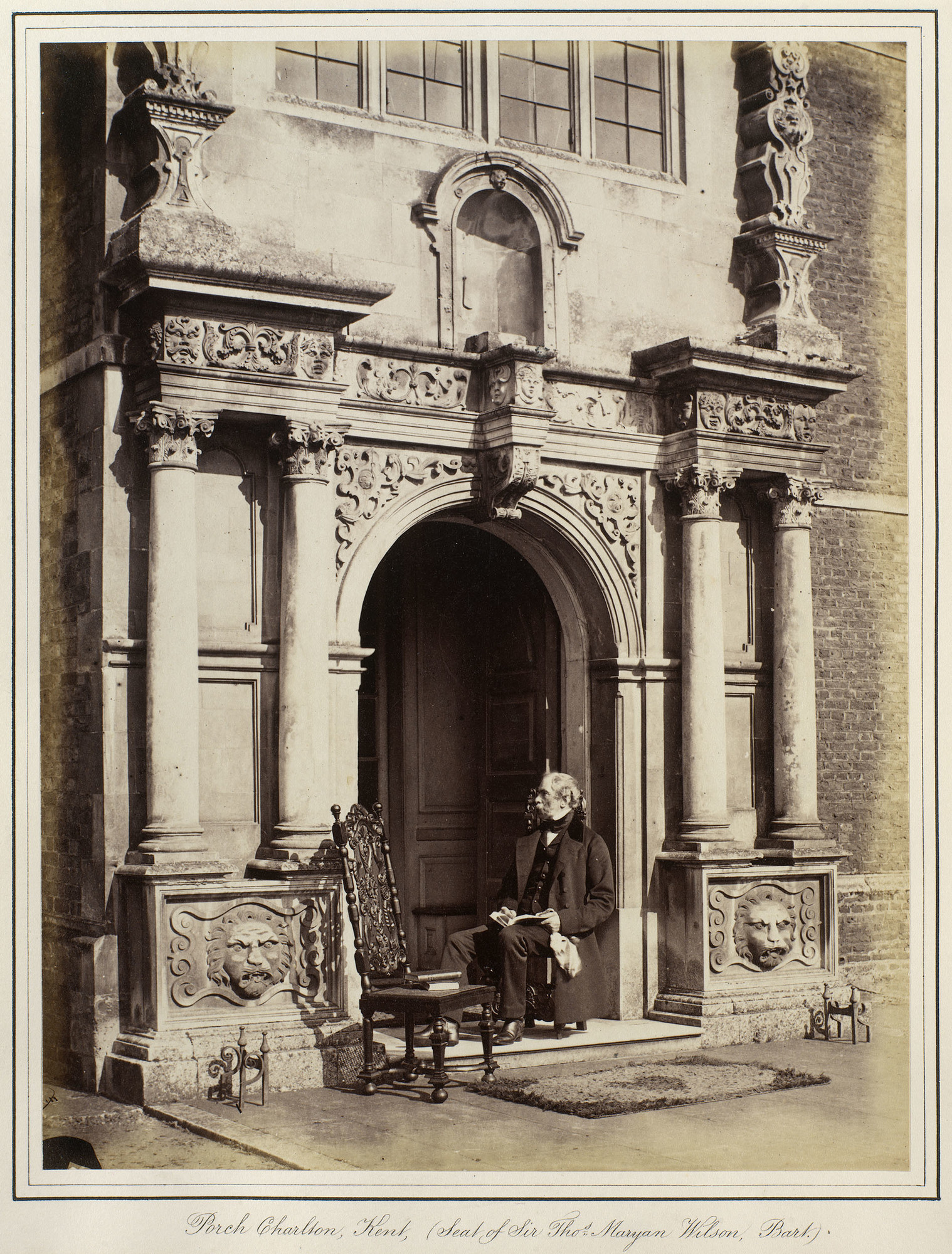
Sir Thomas Maryon Wilson, 8th Baronet (1800–1869), at Charlton House, Kent, England.

Sir Thomas Maryon Wilson (14 April 1800 – 5 May 1869) was the 8th Baronet of Eastbourne and Charlton. He was also lord of the manor of Hampstead and wanted to develop the area with housing but was frustrated by the terms of his father's will and the protests of the residents of the area.

Wilson was born on 14 April 1800 in Southend, Essex. He did not marry, and upon his death (at 7 Bouverie Square, Folkestone on 5 May 1869; he was buried at Charlton), his estates and title passed to his younger brother, John (1802–1876).

He was appointed Colonel of the West Kent Light Infantry Militia on 1 April 1853 and held the position until his death.

Baronetage of England
Preceded by Thomas Maryon Wilson	Baronet (of Eastbourne); 1821-1869	Succeeded by John Maryon Wilson
