= James Long (British Army officer) =

Colonel James Long was a British Army officer during the 18th century.

== Military career ==
Long began his military career as an officer in the 1st Foot Guards. In 1741 he was given a royal warrant to raise a new infantry regiment from "any county or part of Great Britain". The new regiment, named "Long's Regiment" for its Colonel (the common practice for the period) was ranked as the 55th regiment of the line. The regiment later became the 44th Regiment of Foot. The regiment saw service under his command at the Battle of Prestonpans during the Jacobite rising of 1745. Long was appointed to command the 4th Marines in 1748.
