= West Kent Light Infantry =

Auxiliary unit of the British Army

West Kent Light Infantry Militia 3rd Battalion, Queen's Own (Royal West Kent Regiment)
- Active: 20 November 1758–1 April 1953
- Country: Kingdom of Great Britain (1758–1800); United Kingdom (1801–1953)
- Branch: Militia/Special Reserve
- Type: Infantry
- Part of: Queen's Own (Royal West Kent Regiment)
- Garrison/HQ: Maidstone

The West Kent Militia (Light Infantry from 1853), later the 3rd Battalion, Queen's Own (Royal West Kent Regiment) was an auxiliary (Note: It is incorrect to describe the British Militia as 'irregular': throughout their history they were equipped and trained exactly like the line regiments of the regular army, and once embodied in time of war they were fulltime professional soldiers for the duration of their enlistment.) regiment raised in Kent in South East England. From its formal creation in 1758 the regiment served in home and colonial defence in all of Britain's major wars until 1918, and supplied thousands of reinforcements to the Royal West Kents during World War I.

== Background ==
The universal obligation to military service in the Shire levy was long established in England and its legal basis was updated by two acts of 1557 (4 & 5 Ph. & M. cc. 2 and 3), which placed selected men, the 'Trained Bands', under the command of Lords Lieutenant appointed by the monarch. This is seen as the starting date for the organised county militia in England. The Kent Trained Bands were on high alert during the Armada crisis in 1588 and saw some active service during the English Civil War. The Militia was re-established in 1662 after the Restoration of the Monarchy, and was popularly seen as the 'Constitutional Force' in contrast to the 'Standing Army' that was tainted by association with the New Model Army that had supported the military dictatorship of The Protectorate. The militia were kept up during the wars against Louis XIV, when Kent's contingent consisted of six regiments. However, the militia declined in the years after the Peace of Utrecht in 1713.

== West Kent Militia ==
=== Seven Years War ===
Under threat of French invasion during the Seven Years' War, a series of Militia Acts from 1757 re-established county militia regiments, the men being conscripted by means of parish ballots (paid substitutes were permitted) to serve for three years. There was a property qualification for officers, who were commissioned by the lord lieutenant. Kent was given a quota of 960 men to raise. The militia was strongly supported by the Sackvilles, one of Kent's leading families, and despite several anti-militia riots in the county (at one point Major-General Lord George Sackville was besieged at Knole Park by an angry mob) the West Kent Militia was quickly formed at Maidstone. The regiment's weapons were issued from the Tower of London on 20 November 1758 when it had reached 60 per cent of its establishment strength – one of the first units in the country to achieve this. Lord Romney was appointed colonel of the regiment, which was embodied for full-time service on 23 June 1759. (The East Kent Militia followed in 1760; however, unlike the West Kents, it was not embodied for full-time service during the war.)

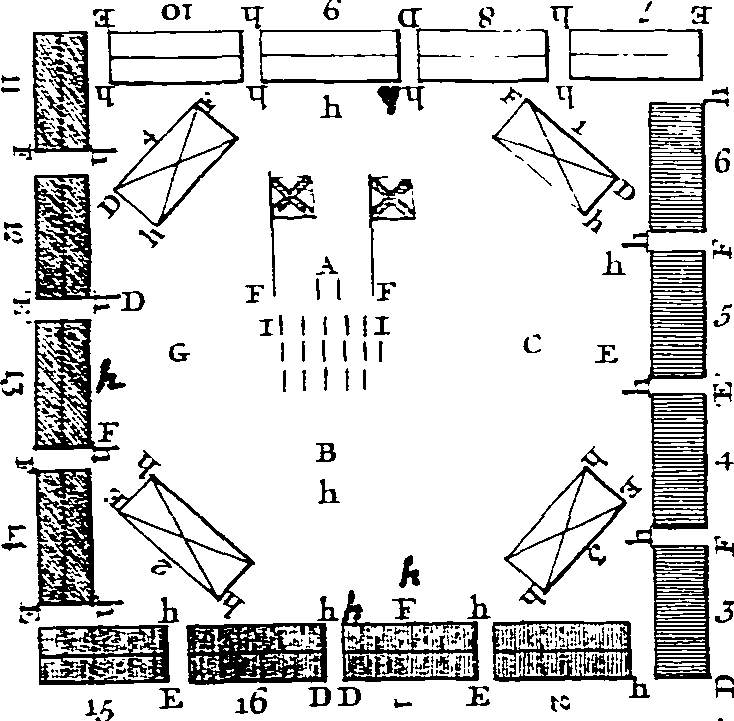
'A regular form of discipline for the militia, as it is perform'd by the West-Kent regiment, commanded by the Right Honourable Robert Lord Romney. By Edward Fage, Adjutant to the said Regiment'.

At this period there was no official drill manual for the militia. The adjutant of the West Kents, Edward Fage, produced his own manual which also included the more advanced training, such as field days. For junior officers the regiment produced a set of cards with the words of command printed on them. The regiment only served in Kent during the Seven Years War, with detachments guarding French prisoners of war at Sissinghurst and Deal. It was disembodied in December 1762 as the war was ending and reverted to a peacetime training routine.

=== War of American Independence ===
The militia was called out after the outbreak of the War of American Independence when the country was threatened with invasion by the Americans' allies, France and Spain. The West Kent Militia was embodied on 31 March 1778. In June the regiment was encamped with five other militia regiments at Winchester, Hampshire, and as the senior regiment in camp (see Precedence below) provided the King's Guard when George III visited on 28 September. Next day the King conferred a knighthood on the commander of the guard of honour, Captain John Brewer Davis, the first militia officer to be so honoured for this service.

The West Kents spent the winter of 1778–79 at Weymouth and Melcombe Regis in Dorset with a detachment at Poole. Early in 1779 there was an outbreak of Typhus. The disease killed most of the French prisoners of war the regiment was guarding, and many civilians, but the regimental surgeon employed local doctors and nurses, and was able to save all but six of the 200 soldiers who caught it.

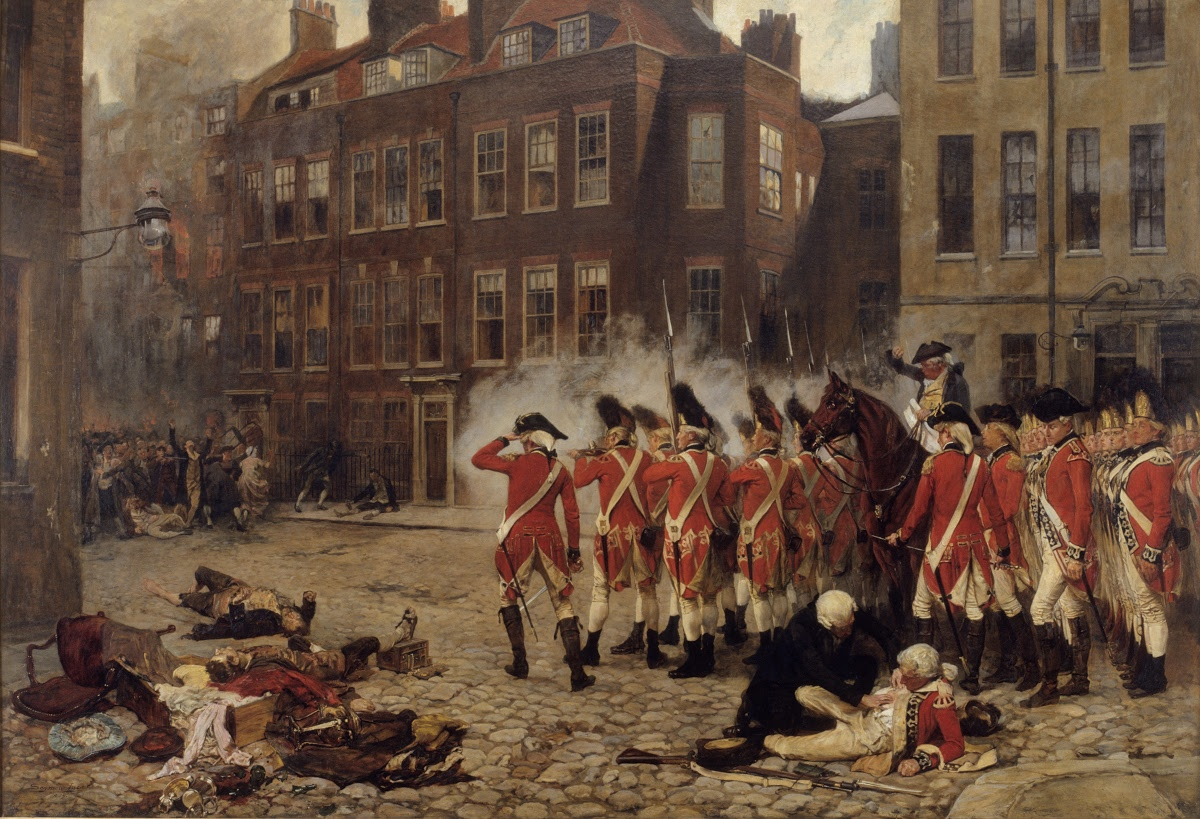
Soldiers deployed to the Gordon Riots, depicted in an 1879 painting The Gordon Riots by John Seymour Lucas.

From June to November 1779 the regiment was encamped with other militia regiments at Warley Camp in Essex. It was then split up and billeted in various parts of Hertfordshire and north-west Essex for the winter. At the end of May 1780 the West Kent Militia was ordered to Hilsea Barracks in Portsmouth, but on 6 June was diverted from its billeting area to Tottenham and Highgate, north of London, to assist in quelling the Gordon Riots in the city. The regiment reached Hilsea on 21 July and remained there until the autumn when it moved to Winchester. In October 1781 it was moved from Winchester to billets in south Berkshire. From July to November it was camped near Harwich in Essex, and then returned to Maidstone.

The militia was stood down at the conclusion of the war and the West Kents were disembodied on 20 March 1783. From 1784 to 1792 the regiments were supposed to assemble for 28 days' annual training, even though to save money only two-thirds of the men were actually called out each year.

=== French Revolutionary and Napoleonic Wars ===
The militia was already being embodied when Revolutionary France declared war on Britain on 1 February 1793; the West Kents had been called out in December 1792. The French Revolutionary Wars saw a new phase for the English militia: they were embodied for a whole generation, and became regiments of full-time professional soldiers (though restricted to service in the British Isles), which the regular army increasingly saw as a prime source of recruits. They served in coast defences, manning garrisons, guarding prisoners of war, and for internal security, while their traditional local defence duties were taken over by the Volunteers and mounted Yeomanry.

In 1796 the West Kents were stationed with the Cambridgeshire Militia in Norwich. The militia were accused of a series of robberies in the town, but when the robbers were caught they turned out to be civilians. After their trial Col Hutton of the West Kents and his opposite number of the Cambridgeshires took out newspaper advertisements declaring that the honour of their men had been vindicated.

In the summer of 1798 the Irish Rebellion became serious, and the French were sending help to the rebels. The West Kent was among the militia regiments that volunteered to serve in Ireland and once the necessary legislation was passed by parliament it was one of 13 regiments whose offer was accepted. The West Kents were brigaded with the Herefords and the two regiments crossed the Thames by 'Flying Bridge' from Gravesend to Tilbury. Then to save time they were conveyed by waggons and then by barges on the Grand Junction Canal travelling at 40–50 miles per day to reach the embarkation port of Liverpool.

The war ended with the Treaty of Amiens in March 1802 and all the militia were stood down, the West Kents being disembodied in April. However, the Peace of Amiens was short-lived and the regiments, whose training commitment had been increased from 21 to 28 days a year, were called out again in 1803, the West Kents being embodied in March 1803. Thomas Dyke (later Sir Thomas Dyke, 4th Baronet) was appointed colonel of the West Kent Militia on 23 May 1803

During the summer of 1805, when Napoleon was massing his 'Army of England' at Boulogne for a projected invasion, the West Kents, with 736 men in 10 companies under Lt-Col Thomas Dalton, were stationed at Colchester Barracks as part of a militia brigade under Brigadier-General Lord Montgomerie.

The Interchange Act 1811 passed in July allowed English militia regiments to serve in Ireland (and vice versa), and the West Kent Militia served there for a period. It was disembodied in June 1814, but was called out again in June 1815 during the short Waterloo Campaign. It was finally disembodied in May 1816.

After Waterloo there was another long peace. Although ballots were still held and officers continued to be commissioned into the militia (Sir Thomas Dyke died on 22 November 1831 and Sir John Kenward Shaw, 6th Baronet, was appointed colonel on 2 March 1832.), the regiments were rarely assembled for training and the permanent staffs of sergeants and drummers (who were occasionally used to maintain public order) were progressively reduced.

== 1852 Reforms ==
The Militia of the United Kingdom was revived by the Militia Act 1852, enacted during a renewed period of international tension. As before, units were raised and administered on a county basis, and filled by voluntary enlistment (although conscription by means of the Militia Ballot might be used if the counties failed to meet their quotas). Training was for 56 days on enlistment, then for 21–28 days per year, during which the men received full army pay. Under the Act, Militia units could be embodied by Royal Proclamation for full-time home defence service in three circumstances:

1. 'Whenever a state of war exists between Her Majesty and any foreign power'.
2. 'In all cases of invasion or upon imminent danger thereof'.
3. 'In all cases of rebellion or insurrection'.

The West Kent Militia was redesignated as the West Kent Light Infantry in March 1853, and Sir Thomas Maryon Wilson, 8th Baronet, was appointed colonel on 1 April that year in succession to Sir John Shaw. Soon afterwards the position of colonel was abolished in militia regiments, the commanding officer in future holding the rank of lieutenant-colonel, although the regiment could appoint an Honorary Colonel.

=== Crimean War and after ===
War having broken out with Russia in 1854 and an expeditionary force sent to the Crimea, the militia began to be called out for home defence. The West Kent LI was embodied at Maidstone in January 1855 and remained there until May. From June to November it was stationed at Aldershot, and then went to Ireland, first to Athlone, moving by February 1856 to Castlebar. It returned to England and was disembodied in July 1856 Thereafter the militia regiments were called out for their annual training.

Sir Thomas Maryon-Wilson died in May 1869, and the regiment's Major, R.T.G.G. Monypenny, formerly an officer in the 86th Foot, was promoted to Lt-Col in command on 22 May. At the same time, Viscount Torrington, who had served as the regimental lieutenant-colonel in the 1850s, was appointed as its first Honorary Colonel.

== Cardwell reforms ==
Under the 'Localisation of the Forces' scheme introduced by the Cardwell Reforms of 1872, militia regiments were brigaded with their local regular and Volunteer battalions – for the West Kent LI this was with the 50th (Queen's Own) and 97th (Earl of Ulster's) Regiments in Sub-District No 46 (County of Kent) at Maidstone, where a Brigade Depot was formed in April 1873. The Cardwell organisation envisaged two militia battalions to each sub-district, and the West Kent Militia formed a 2nd Battalion on 29 July 1876. The militia now came under the War Office rather than their county lords lieutenant. Around a third of the recruits and many young officers went on to join the regular army.

Although often referred to as brigades, the sub-districts were purely administrative organisations, but in a continuation of the Cardwell Reforms a mobilisation scheme began to appear in the Army List from December 1875. This assigned regular and militia units to places in an order of battle of corps, divisions and brigades for the 'Active Army', even though these formations were entirely theoretical, with no staff or services assigned. The West Kent LI were assigned to 1st Brigade of 3rd Division, III Corps. The division, the rest of which comprised militia regiments from London and Middlesex, would have mustered at Tunbridge Wells and Maidstone in time of war.

=== 3rd Battalion, Queen's Own (Royal West Kent Regiment) ===
The Childers Reforms took Cardwell's reforms further, with the linked battalions forming single regiments. From 1 July 1881 the 50th and 97th Regiments became the 1st and 2nd Battalions of the Queen's Own (Royal West Kent Regiment), and the 1st and 2nd Battalions of the West Kent Light Infantry became its 3rd and 4th Bns. However, the two militia battalions remained small (6 companies each) and were amalgamated on 1 April 1894

During the Second Boer War the battalion was embodied on 11 December 1899. It volunteered for foreign service and was stationed at Malta in 1900–01. It was disembodied on 10 June 1901, and afterwards was awarded the Battle Honour Mediterranean 1900–01. (Note: Under Army Order 251 of 1910, the Special Reserve were to bear the same battle honours as their parent regiments, so the Mediterranean honour, which was peculiar to militia units, was extinguished.)

== Special Reserve ==
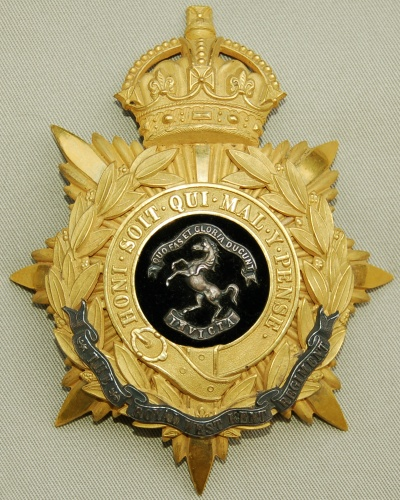
Officer's helmet Plate of the Queen's Own (Royal West Kent Regiment), 1902–1914.

After the Boer War, the future of the Militia was called into question. There were moves to reform the Auxiliary Forces (Militia, Yeomanry and Volunteers) to take their place in the six Army Corps proposed by the Secretary of State for War, St John Brodrick. However, little of Brodrick's scheme was carried out. Under the more sweeping Haldane Reforms of 1908, the Militia was replaced by the Special Reserve (SR), a semi-professional force whose role was to provide reinforcement drafts for regular units serving overseas in wartime, rather like the earlier Militia Reserve. The battalion became the 3rd (Reserve) Battalion, Queen's Own (Royal West Kent Regiment), on 9 August 1908.

== World War I ==
=== 3rd (Reserve) Battalion ===
On the outbreak of World War I the battalion was embodied on 4 August 1914 under Lt-Col Sir Arthur Griffith-Boscawen, MP, who had served with the battalion in Malta and had held the command since 3 September 1910. The battalion moved to its war station at Chatham, where it remained until the summer of 1918.

The 3rd Battalion's role was to equip the Reservists and Special Reservists of the Royal West Kents and send them as reinforcement drafts to the Regular battalions serving overseas (the 1st on the Western Front, the 2nd in Mesopotamia). Once the pool of reservists had dried up, the 3rd Bn trained thousands of raw recruits for the active service battalions. The 9th (Reserve) Battalion was formed alongside the 3rd Bn at Chatham in October 1914 to provide reinforcements for the 'Kitchener's Army' battalions of the Royal West Kents (see below).

Under War Office Instruction 106 of 10 November 1915 the battalion was ordered to send a draft of 109 men to the new Machine Gun Training Centre at Grantham where they were to form the basis of a brigade machine-gun company of the new Machine Gun Corps. In addition, 10 men at a time were to undergo training at Grantham as battalion machine gunners. The order stated that 'Great care should be taken in the selection of men for training as machine gunners as only well educated and intelligent men are suitable for this work'.

In the summer of 1918 the battalion was moved to Leysdown-on-Sea on the Isle of Sheppey as part of the Thames and Medway Garrison. It continued in existence after the Armistice with Germany until the remaining personnel were drafted to the 2nd Bn on 2 August 1919 and the battalion was disembodied on 15 August.

=== 9th (Reserve) Battalion ===
After Lord Kitchener issued his call for volunteers in August 1914, the battalions of the 1st, 2nd and 3rd New Armies ('K1', 'K2' and 'K3' of 'Kitchener's Army') were quickly formed at the regimental depots. The SR battalions also swelled with new recruits and were soon well above their establishment strength. On 8 October 1914 each SR battalion was ordered to use the surplus to form a service battalion of the 4th New Army ('K4'). Accordingly, the 3rd (Reserve) Bn formed the 9th (Service) Bn at Chatham on 24 October. It was assigned to 93rd Brigade of 31st Division and began training for active service. On 10 April 1915 the War Office decided to convert the K4 battalions into 2nd Reserve units, providing drafts for the K1–K3 battalions in the same way that the SR was doing for the Regular battalions. The battalion became 9th (Reserve) Bn in 5th Reserve Brigade, where it trained drafts for the 6th, 7th, and 8th (Service) Bns of the West Kents. In June 1915 it moved to Canterbury, and then in July to Colchester in Essex. Finally it moved to Shoreham-by-Sea in Sussex with 5th Reserve Bde in September 1915 and remained there. On 1 September 1916 the 2nd Reserve battalions were transferred to the Training Reserve and 9th West Kents was absorbed into 16th (Reserve) Battalion, Royal Fusiliers to form 22nd Training Reserve Battalion, though the training staff retained their West Kents badges.

=== Postwar ===
The SR resumed its old title of Militia in 1921 but like most militia units the 3rd Buffs remained in abeyance after World War I. (In 1921 the parent regiment became the Queen's Own Royal West Kent Regiment.) By the outbreak of World War II in 1939, no officers remained listed for the 3rd Bn. The Militia was formally disbanded in April 1953.

== Heritage and ceremonial ==
=== Uniforms and insignia ===
As early as 1778 the Kent Militia regiments are reported to have worn red coats with grey facings, but a 1780 source suggests this was light blue. In the 19th Century both Kent Militia regiments wore facings described as 'Kentish Grey'. The badge for both regiments was the White Horse of Kent with the motto Invicta. The officers of the West Kents wore a silver shoulder-belt plate with the White Horse within an oval inscribed by the regimental name, on an eight-pointed cut star. After the West Kents became light infantry in 1853 the White Horse and motto was worn inside the strings of a bugle-horn. The coatee button had the White Horse and motto resting on a crowned garter inscribed 'West Kent Light Infantry'. Below the 'Invicta' scroll was a bugle-horn without cords or tassels surrounding the regimental number '37'. After 1881 the battalion adopted the insignia of the Royal West Kents, including the blue facings of a 'Royal' regiment.

=== Precedence ===
During the War of American Independence the counties were given an order of precedence determined by ballot each year. For the Kent Militia the positions were:

- 12th on 1 June 1778
- 4th on 12 May 1779
- 36th on 6 May 1780
- 27th on 28 April 1781
- 23rd on 7 May 1782

The militia order of precedence balloted for in 1793 (Kent was 1st) remained in force throughout the French Revolutionary War: this covered all the regiments in the county. Another ballot for precedence took place at the start of the Napoleonic War, when Kent was 57th.This order continued until 1833. In that year the King drew the lots for individual regiments and the resulting list remained in force with minor amendments until the end of the militia. The regiments raised before the peace of 1763 took the first 47 places and West Kent was 37th. Formally, it became the 37th, or West Kent Militia; while most regiments paid little notice to the additional number, the West Kent LI incorporated it into their insignia.

=== Colonels ===
The following served as Colonel or Honorary Colonel of the regiment:

Colonel

- Robert Marsham, 2nd Baron Romney, appointed 1759
- Colonel Hutton?
- Sir Thomas Dyke, 4th Baronet, appointed 23 May 1803
- Sir John Kenward Shaw, 6th Baronet, appointed 2 March 1832
- Sir Thomas Maryon Wilson, 8th Baronet, appointed 1 April 1853

Honorary Colonel

- George Byng, 7th Viscount Torrington, appointed 22 May 1869, died 27 April 1884
- Field Marshal Prince Arthur, Duke of Connaught and Strathearn, appointed 23 August 1884

== See also ==
- Militia (Great Britain)
- Militia (United Kingdom)
- Special Reserve
- Kent Trained Bands
- Kent Militia
- East Kent Militia
- Queen's Own Royal West Kent Regiment
