= 4th Regiment of Marines (British Army) =

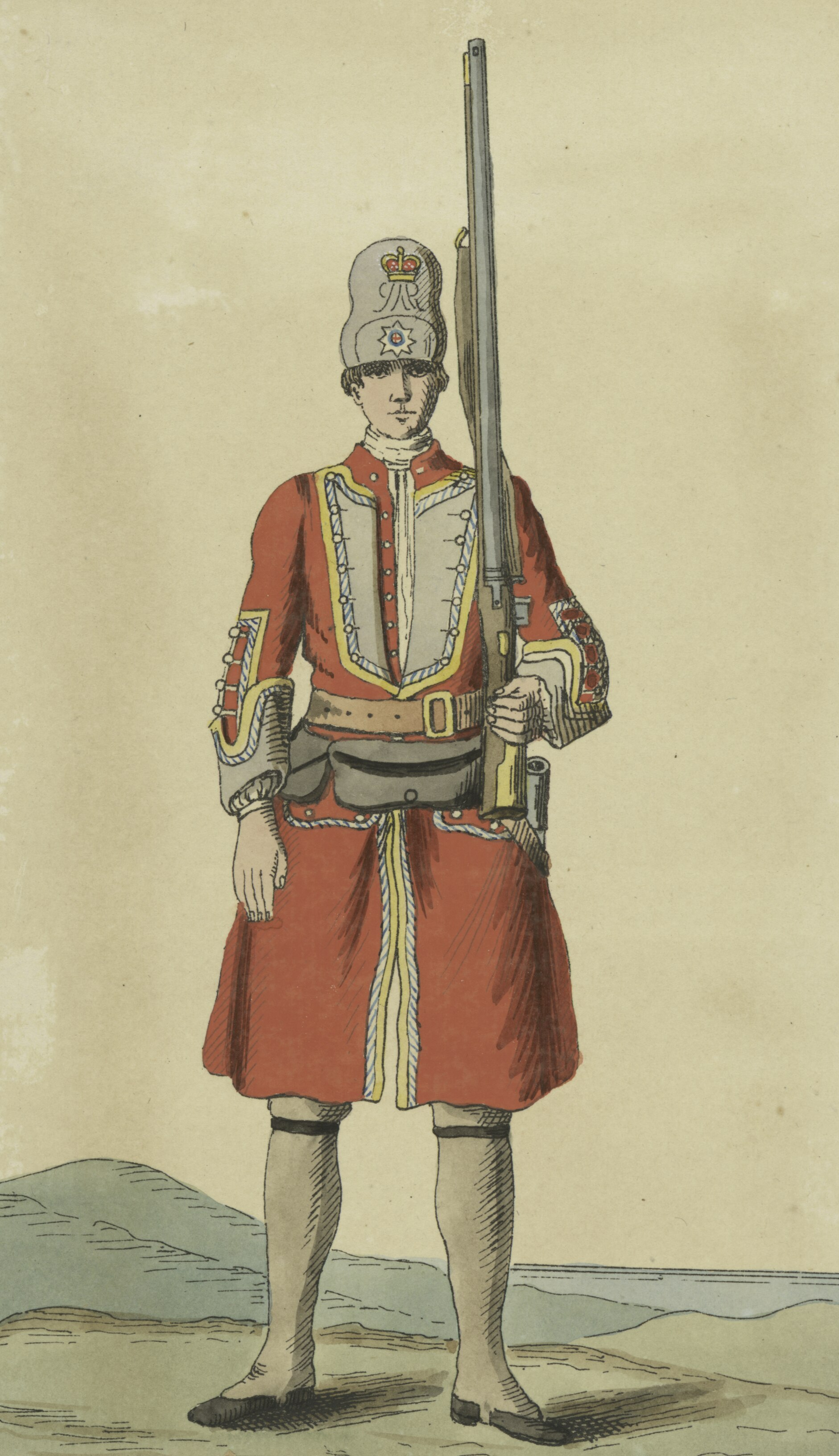
- A regimental private in c. 1742
- Active: 1739–1748
- Country: Great Britain
- Branch: British Army
- Type: Infantry
- Role: Marines
- Size: One battalion
- Engagements: War of Jenkins' Ear; Battle of Cartagena de Indias

Commanders
- Colonel of the Regiment: John Wynyard (1739–1742); George Byng (1742–1748); James Long (1748)

The 4th Regiment of Marines was a marine regiment of the British Army. It was raised on 17 November 1739 by Colonel John Wynyard as John Wynyard's Regiment of Marines as part of six marine regiments raised that month for service in the War of Jenkins' Ear. The regiment, which was ranked as the "4th Regiment of Marines", embarked for the West Indies at Portsmouth on 4 November 1740 and upon arriving in the Caribbean participated in the Battle of Cartagena de Indias in March 1741. George Byng became the new regimental colonel on 31 August 1742 and the regiment was correspondingly renamed George Byng's Regiment of Marines.

The regiment was ranked as the 47th Regiment of Foot in 1747, the same year it was transferred to the British Admiralty's control. In 1748 James Long became the new regimental colonel and the regiment was renamed again for a third and final time to James Long's Regiment of Marines. Following the signing of the Treaty of Aix-la-Chapelle on 18 October 1748, the regiment was disbanded alongside the rest of the British army's marine regiments on 8 November.
