= Southill Lake and Woods =

Protected area in Bedfordshire, England

Coordinates: 52.073077°N 0.330086°W

- Site of Special Scientific Interest
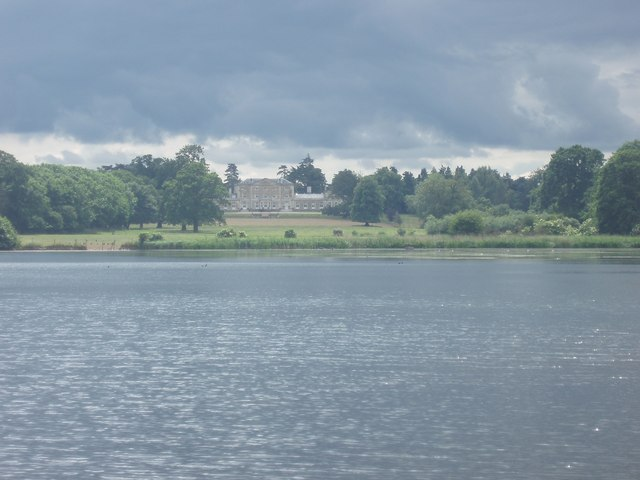
- Location of Southill Lake and Woods.
- Area of search: Bedfordshire
- Grid reference: TL141428
- Interest: Biological
- Area: 25.3 ha (63 acres)
- Notification date: 1985
- Location map: Magic Map

Southill Lake and Woods is a 25.3-hectare (63-acre) biological Site of Special Scientific Interest in Southill in Bedfordshire. It is part of Southill Park, which was designed by Capability Brown, and is registered by English Heritage for its special historic interest, and is the garden of a house of the same name.

The wood is a wet valley of alder, fed by springs, and a small stream runs down to the lake. There is fen vegetation in more open areas. The lake has a characteristic population of breeding birds, and an island has one of only two surviving heronries in the county.

The site is private and is not open to the public.
