= John Byng (disambiguation) =

John Byng may refer to:

- John Byng (1704–1757), British Admiral in the Seven Years' War, executed for "fail[ing] to do his utmost"
- John Byng, 5th Viscount Torrington (1743–1813), British peer and diarist
- John Byng, 1st Earl of Strafford (1772–1860), British peer, politician and soldier during the Napoleonic Wars

== See also ==
- Jon Bing, Norwegian writer and law professor
- Jonathan Bing, New York politician
