= Pattee Byng, 2nd Viscount Torrington =

British Army officer, politician and courtier

The Right Honourable The Viscount Torrington PC
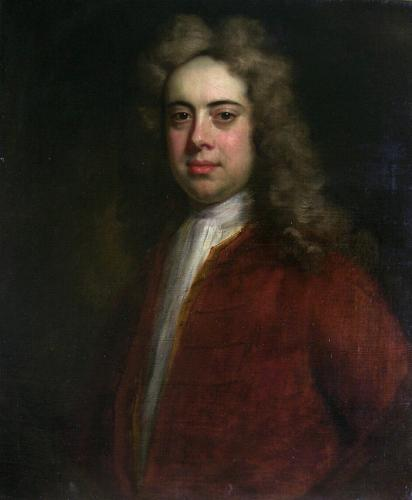
- Portrait by Sir Godfrey Kneller
- Born: 25 May 1699; Wrotham, Kent
- Died: 23 January 1747 (aged 47); Southill, Bedfordshire
- Relatives: John Byng (brother); John Byng, 1st Earl of Strafford (great-nephew)
- Military career
- Allegiance: Great Britain
- Branch: British Army
- Service years: 1712–1721
- Rank: Captain
- Unit: Royal Horse Guards

Captain Pattee Byng, 2nd Viscount Torrington, PC (25 May 1699 – 23 January 1747) was a British Army officer, politician and courtier who sat in the House of Commons of Great Britain from 1723 to 1733 when he succeeded to the peerage as Viscount Torrington. His career included service as Captain of the Yeomen of the Guard during the reign of King George II.

== Life and career ==
Byng was the eldest son of George Byng, 1st Viscount Torrington by his wife Margaret Master. He joined the British Army as a cornet in the Royal Horse Guards in 1712 and later was captain from 1715 to 1718. He resigned from the Army in 1721 due to his father's elevation to the peerage as Viscount Torrington.

Byng replaced his father as Member of Parliament for Plymouth at a by-election on 31 October 1723. In 1724, he became the Treasurer of the Navy for the following decade, At the 1727 general election he was elected as MP for Bedfordshire. From 1727 to 1733 he continued to serve as Treasurer of the Navy while his father was First Lord of the Admiralty. In 1732 he became a Privy Councillor and a Commissioner of Greenwich Hospital. He had to vacate his seat in the House of Commons in 1733 when he succeeded to the Torrington viscountcy on the death of his father.

In 1734, upon taking his seat in the House of Lords, Byng was given the position of Vice-Treasurer and Paymaster General of Ireland and by 1746, he became Captain of the Yeomen of the Guard. He served in both positions until his death.

== Marriage and children ==
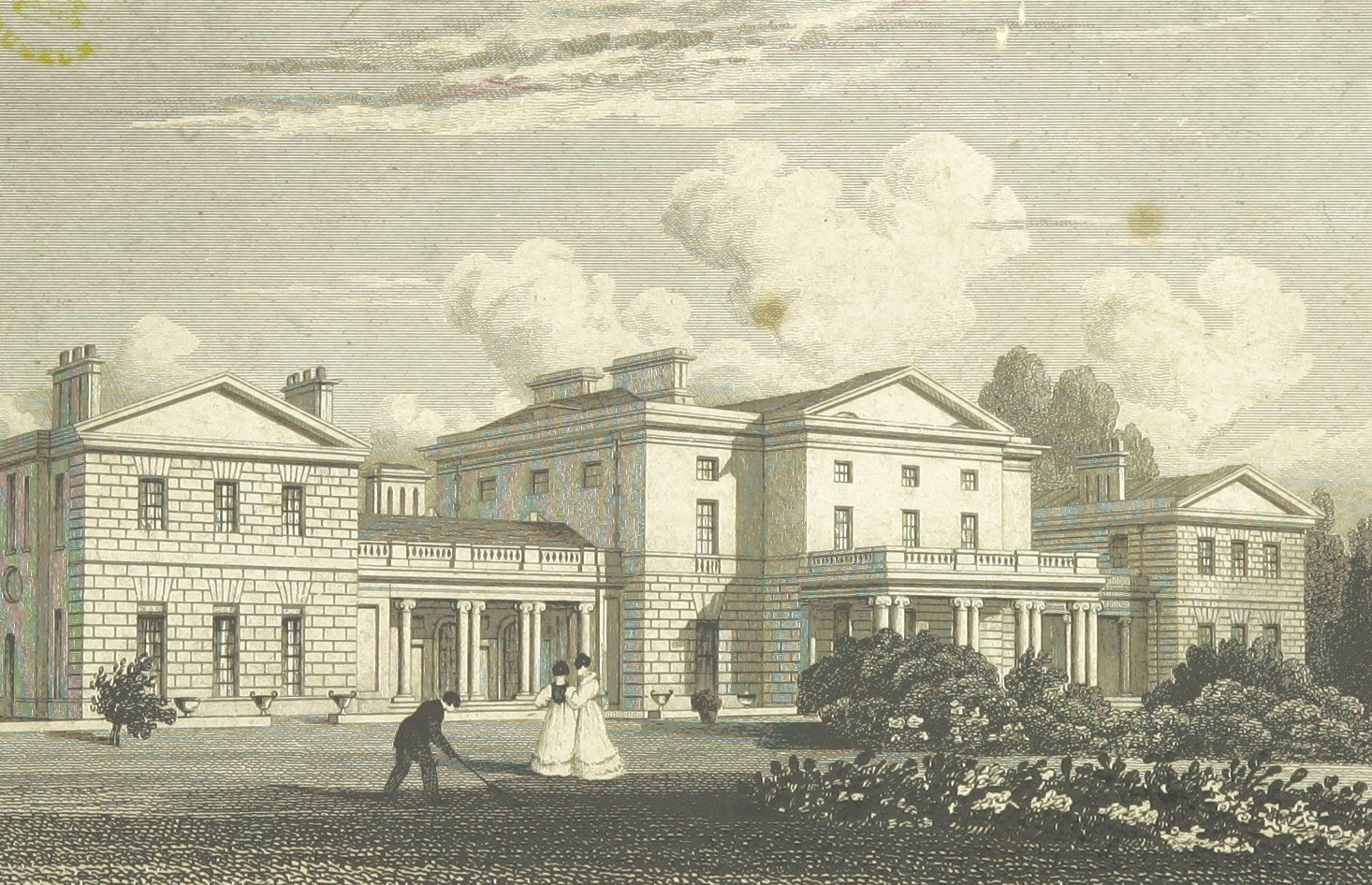
Southill Park

On 11 June 1724 Byng married Lady Charlotte Montagu (1705 - 1759), 4th daughter of Charles Montagu, 1st Duke of Manchester by his wife The Hon. Doddington Greville. By his wife, who later became a Lady of the Bedchamber to Augusta, Princess of Wales, he had two sons, who both died as infants and predeceased him:

- George Byng (1728-15 May 1730), died an infant.
- Frederick Byng (9 December 1735 – 10 January 1736), died an infant.

In 1727 his father settled the family seat at Southill Park, Bedfordshire on him.

== Death and burial ==
Byng died on 23 January 1747 and was buried in the Byng vault in the Church of All Saints in Southill, Bedfordshire. He was survived by his wife who died on 14 September 1759.

== Succession ==
Having died without surviving issue his title passed to his younger brother George Byng, 3rd Viscount Torrington.

== Arms ==
Coat of arms of Pattee Byng, 2nd Viscount Torrington
Coronet That of a viscount. Crest An heraldic antelope ermine. Escutcheon Quarterly, sable and argent, in the 1st quarter a lion rampant of the second. Supporters Dexter, an heraldic antelope ermine, armed, unguled, maned and tufted or, standing on a ship’s gun proper; sinister, a sea-horse also proper also on a ship’s gun. Motto Tuebor (I will defend).

Parliament of Great Britain
Preceded by Sir John Rogers; Sir George Byng	Member of Parliament for Plymouth; 1721–1727; With: Charles Trelawny to 1721; William Richard Chetwynd 1721–1727	Succeeded by Arthur Stert; George Treby
Preceded by The Hon. Charles Leigh	Member of Parliament for Bedfordshire; 1727–1733; With: Sir Rowald Alston, 4th Baronet	Succeeded by The Hon. Charles Leigh; Sir Rowald Alston, 4th Baronet
Political offices
Preceded by George Byng, 1st Viscount Torrington	Treasurer of the Navy; 1724–1734	Succeeded by Arthur Onslow
Political offices
Preceded by John Berkeley, 5th Baron Berkeley of Stratton	Captain of the Yeomen of the Guard; 1746–1747	Succeeded by Hugh Boscawen, 2nd Viscount Falmouth
Peerage of Great Britain
Preceded by George Byng	Viscount Torrington; 1733–1747	Succeeded by George Byng
