= John Brewer Davis =

English cricketer

John Davis
Personal information
- Full name: John Brewer Davis
- Born: 1741; England
- Died: 9 November 1817 (aged 75–76); Westminster, London

Domestic team information
- Years: Team
- 1773: Kent
- FC debut: 21 June 1773 Kent v Surrey
- Last FC: 19 July 1773 Kent v Surrey
- Source: CricketArchive, 7 April 2022

Sir John Brewer Davis (1741 – 9 November 1817) was the son of the Rev Dr D Davis Prebendary of Canterbury. He is notable for his involvement in cricket through his connections with the Kent county team. In 1774, he sat on a committee of gentry that laid down the first known laws of cricket.

Davis was active as a player before cricket's statistical record began in 1772. In the 1773 season, he has been recorded in two important matches playing for Kent against Surrey. He scored 23 and 4 in the first match at Laleham Burway and 4 and 0 in the return game at Bishopsbourne Paddock. He took 2 catches in the latter match.

He was a Captain in the West Kent Militia. In the summer of 1778 the regiment was encamped at Winchester, Hampshire, and as the senior regiment in camp provided the King's Guard when George III visited on 28 September. Captain Davis commanded the guard of honour and next day the King conferred a knighthood on him, the first militia officer to be so honoured for this service.
