= George Byng, 4th Viscount Torrington =

British diplomat

The Right Honourable The Viscount Torrington
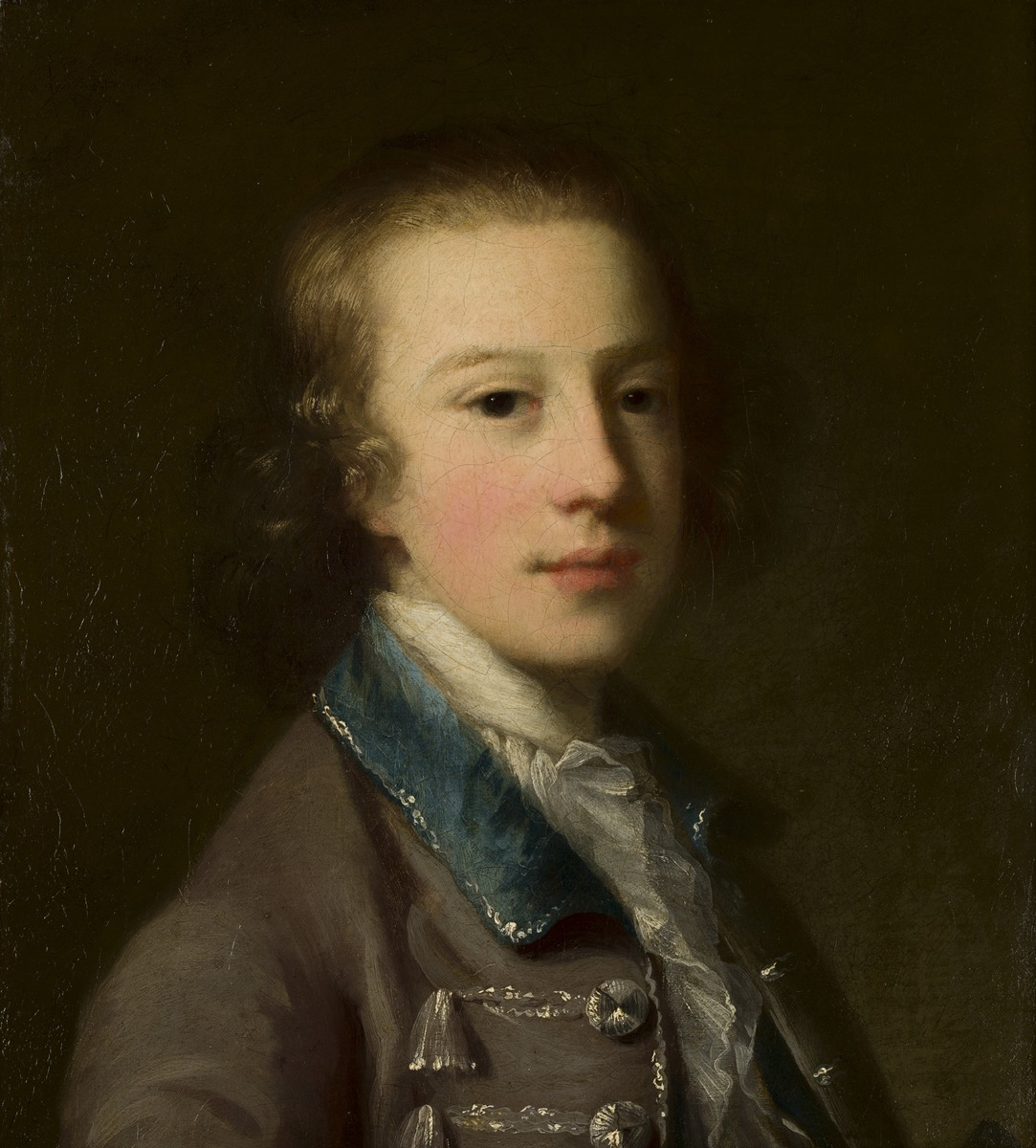
- Portrait by John Astley

British minister in Brussels
- In office 1783–1792
- Preceded by: Alleyne FitzHerbert
- Succeeded by: The Earl of Elgin

Personal details
- Born: George Byng; 11 October 1740
- Died: 14 December 1812 (aged 72)
- Spouse: Lady Lucy Boyle (m. 1765; died 1792)
- Children: 7
- Parent(s): George Byng, 3rd Viscount Torrington; Elizabeth Daniel

George Byng, 4th Viscount Torrington (11 October 1740 – 14 December 1812) was a British diplomat.

== Early life ==
He was the eldest son and heir of Major-General George Byng, 3rd Viscount Torrington (1701–1750), by his wife Elizabeth Daniel. His paternal grandfather, Admiral of the Fleet Sir George Byng, KB, was created a baronet in 1715 before being elevated to the peerage as Viscount Torrington in 1721, his family were formerly seated at Southill Park in Bedfordshire. He was a great-uncle of the politician Lord John Russell and in 1847 his cousin, Field Marshal Sir John Byng, GCB, was created Earl of Strafford.

== Career ==
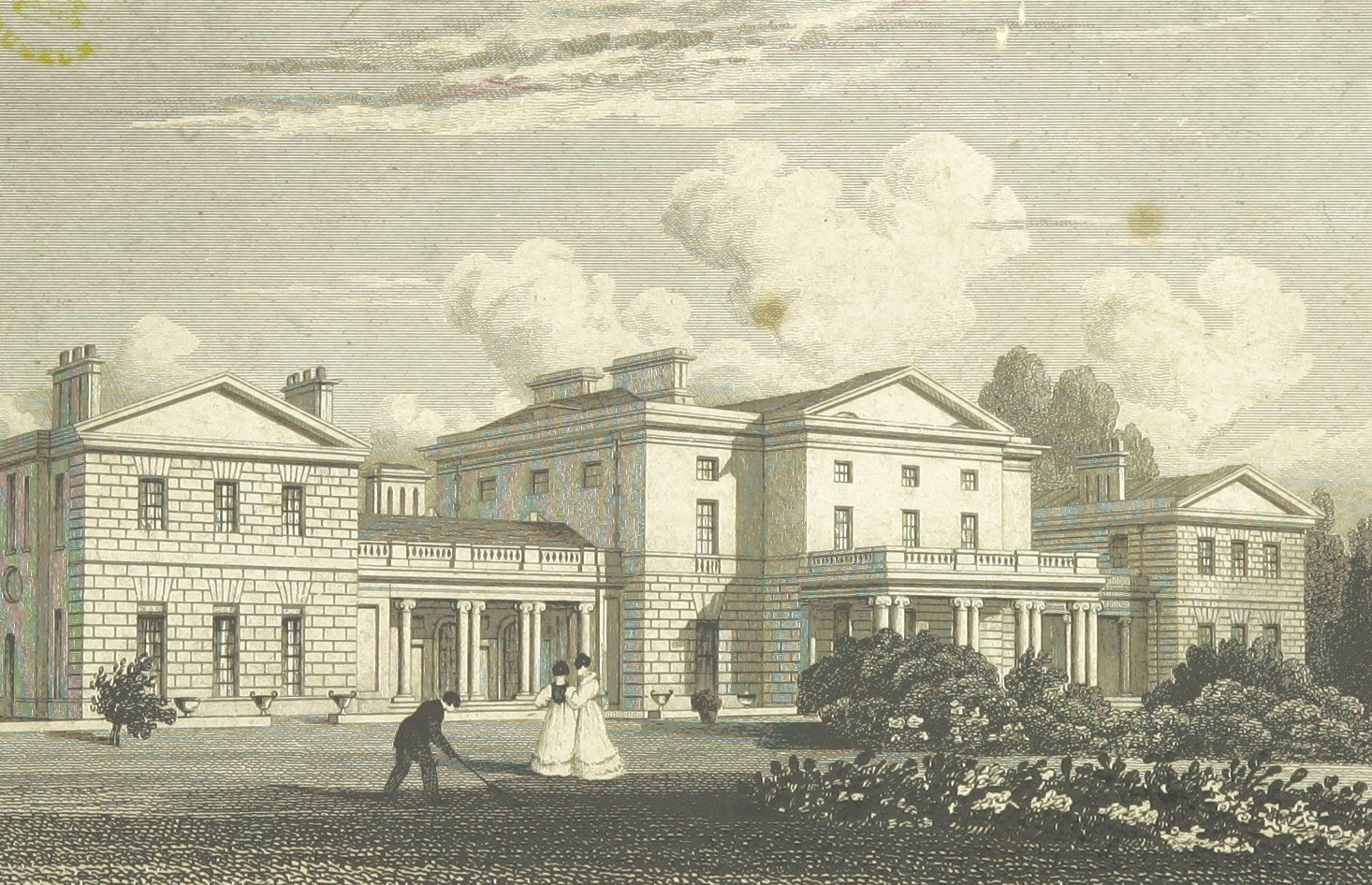
Southill Park

He inherited the Torrington viscountcy and the family seat of Southill Park in Bedfordshire on the death of his father in 1750. He sold Southill to the beer magnate, Samuel Whitbread, in 1795.

== Personal life ==
On 20 July 1765 he married Lady Lucy Boyle (1744–1792), a daughter of John Boyle, 5th Earl of Cork, by his wife, Margaret Hamilton, by whom he had seven children, three sons who all predeceased him, and four daughters:

- Hon. Lucy Elizabeth Byng (1760–1844), who married Orlando Bridgeman, 1st Earl of Bradford, in 1788.
- Hon. Georgiana Elizabeth Byng (1768–1801), who married John Russell, later 6th Duke of Bedford, in 1786.
- Hon. William Henry Byng (1769–1770), who died young, predeceasing his father.
- Hon. Isabella Elizabeth Byng (1773–1830), who married Thomas Thynne, 2nd Marquess of Bath, in 1794.
- Hon. William Henry Byng (1775–1792), who predeceased his father.
- Hon. George Byng (1777–1792), who predeceased his father.
- Hon. Emily Elizabeth Byng (1779–1824), who married Henry Seymour of Brighthelmston, Sussex, son of Lord Robert Seymour, in 1801.

Lord Torrington died on 14 December 1812, and as he left no surviving male issue he was succeeded in the viscountcy by his younger brother John Byng, 5th Viscount Torrington, who died less than a month later.

== See also ==
- Viscount Torrington

== Arms ==
Coat of arms of George Byng, 4th Viscount Torrington
Coronet That of a viscount. Crest An heraldic antelope ermine. Escutcheon Quarterly, sable and argent, in the 1st quarter a lion rampant of the second. Supporters Dexter, an heraldic antelope ermine, armed, unguled, maned and tufted or, standing on a ship’s gun proper; sinister, a sea-horse also proper also on a ship’s gun. Motto Tuebor (I will defend).

Diplomatic posts
Preceded by Alleyne FitzHerbert	British Minister in Brussels; 1783–1792	Succeeded by The Earl of Elgin
Peerage of Great Britain
Preceded by George Byng	Viscount Torrington; 1750–1812	Succeeded by John Byng
