= John Wynyard =

British Army general

John Wynyard (died 20 February 1752) was an officer of the British Army.

On 25 December 1703 he was made captain-lieutenant of Roger Elliott's Regiment of Foot, being also the regimental adjutant. He was a captain by 1709, when he was on recruiting service in England. When the regiment was disbanded in 1713 he was placed on half-pay.

Wynyard served with the 17th Regiment of Foot in the Jacobite rising of 1715, and on 10 July 1718 was promoted to the lieutenant-colonelcy of the regiment. He was promoted to colonel of the newly raised 4th Regiment of Marines on 20 November 1739, and transferred to the colonelcy of the 17th Foot on 31 August 1742.

John Wynyard was for many years commander-in-chief at Gibraltar and Port Mahon. He was promoted to lieutenant-general in September 1747 and died in 1752. He was buried in Westminster Abbey.

Military offices
Preceded by James Tyrrell	Colonel of Wynyard's Regiment of Foot; 1742–1752	Succeeded by Edward Richbell
