= Andalusia Molesworth =

British singer and society hostess

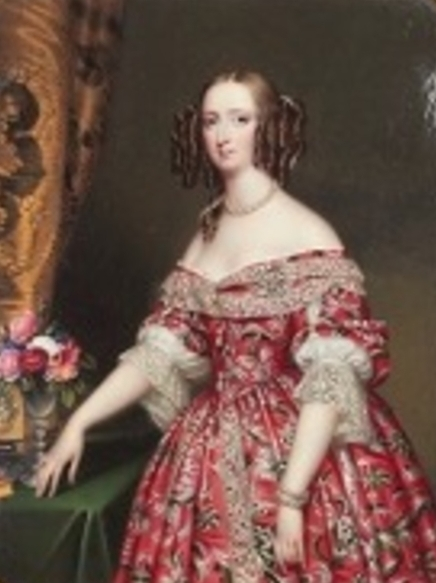
- Portrait by Henry Pierce Bone, 1848
- Born: Andalusia Carstairs
- Died: 16 May 1888; Eaton Place
- Education: Royal Academy of Music
- Known for: Society hostess
- Spouses: Mr. Grant; Temple West; Sir William Molesworth, 8th Baronet
- Partner: George Byng, 7th Viscount Torrington

Andalusia Molesworth born Andalusia Carstairs also known as Andalusia Grant; Lady Molesworth and Andalusia West ( – 16 May 1888) was a British singer and society hostess.

== Life ==
Molesworth did not come from a noble family. She entered the Royal Academy of Music and on leaving she demonstrated her abilities as a soprano singer at Covent Garden, although her acting abilities were unimpressive. She was known as Miss Grant and she appeared in a play about Rob Roy MacGregor, Guy Mannering and Isidore de Merida with the tenor John Braham.

She retired and married an older landowner, Temple West, of Mathon Lodge, Worcestershire, in 1831. When he died in 1839 she moved to London and took a house at 29 Half Moon Street.

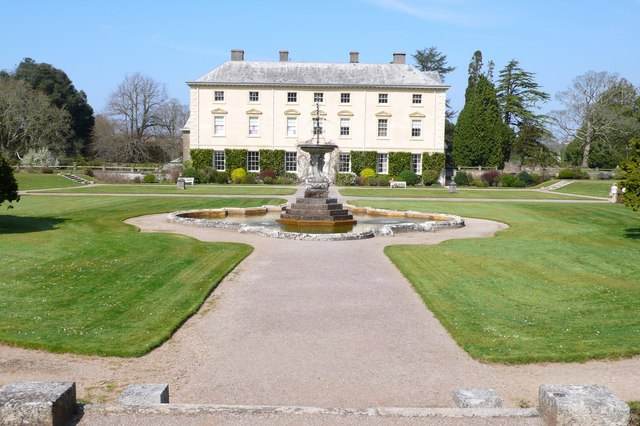
Pencarrow House

She married Sir William Molesworth, 8th Baronet after a one-month engagement on 9 July 1844. His family were not keen given her lack of background and that she was maybe too old to deliver an heir. Sir William had enjoyed the support of Harriet Grote and her husband, but Harriet broke with him over his marriage. An ambitious and scheming character in Dickens' Bleak House was said to be based on Molesworth. She became known as a hostess inviting notable people to stay at Pencarrow House in Cornwall including Charles Dickens, Sir Arthur Sullivan and Emperor Napoleon III.

George Byng, 7th Viscount Torrington was her companion after she became a widow. When she died she left her fortune to Byng's nephew and heir, as she was estranged from her dead husband's family. However she still remembered her last husband and in 1869 she had the Molesworth Mausoleum constructed at Kensal Green Cemetery.

Molesworth continued to be a society hostess for thirty years until she died in Eaton Place on 16 May 1888.
