= George Byng, 7th Viscount Torrington =

British colonial administrator and courtier

The Right Honourable The Viscount Torrington
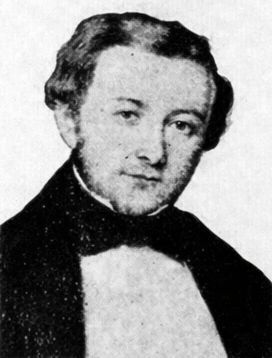

9th Governor of British Ceylon
- In office 29 May 1847 – 8 October 1850
- Monarch: Queen Victoria
- Preceded by: James Emerson Tennent (Acting governor)
- Succeeded by: Charles Justin MacCarthy (Acting governor)

Personal details
- Born: 9 September 1812
- Died: 27 April 1884 (aged 71)

George Byng, 7th Viscount Torrington (9 September 1812 – 27 April 1884), was a British colonial administrator and courtier.

== Family ==
Torrington was the son of Vice-Admiral George Byng, 6th Viscount Torrington (1768–1831).

He succeeded his father in the viscountcy in 1831 at the age of eighteen. On 19 March 1833 he married Mary Anne, only daughter of Sir John Astley, 1st Baronet. Their only daughter, Frances Elizabeth, died on 2 September 1853. Lady Torrington died on 26 January 1885.

== Career ==
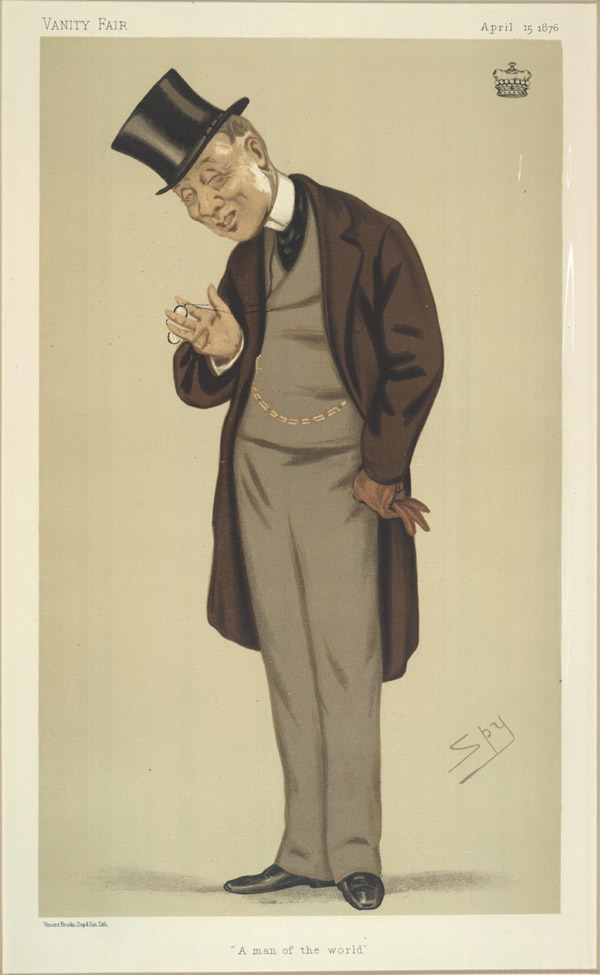
"A man of the world". Caricature by Spy published in Vanity Fair in 1876.

In 1847 he was appointed Governor of Ceylon, a post he held until 1850. There he is known for his harsh suppression of the 1848 civil uprising. He later served as a Permanent Lord-in-waiting to Albert, Prince Consort from 1853 to 1859 and to Queen Victoria from 1859 to 1884.

He served as Lieutenant-Colonel of the West Kent Light Infantry Militia (later the 3rd and 4th Battalions, Queen's Own (Royal West Kent Regiment)) in the 1850s, was appointed as the regiment's Honorary Colonel in 1869.

He was the companion of Andalusia Molesworth after she became a widow. When she died she left her fortune to Byng's nephew and heir as she was estranged from her ex-husband's family.

== Death and burial ==
He died on 27 April 1884, at the age of 71. He was buried in the churchyard of St. Lawrence's Church, Mereworth, Kent, in the United Kingdom.

== Succession ==
He was succeeded in the viscountcy by his nephew George Byng, 8th Viscount Torrington.

== Arms ==
Coat of arms of George Byng, 7th Viscount Torrington
Coronet That of a viscount. Crest An heraldic antelope ermine. Escutcheon Quarterly, sable and argent, in the 1st quarter a lion rampant of the second. Supporters Dexter, an heraldic antelope ermine, armed, unguled, maned and tufted or, standing on a ship’s gun proper; sinister, a sea-horse also proper also on a ship’s gun. Motto Tuebor (I will defend).

Government offices
Preceded by James Emerson Tennent acting governor	Governor of Ceylon; 1847–1850	Succeeded by Charles Justin MacCarthy acting governor
Peerage of Great Britain
Preceded by George Byng	Viscount Torrington; 1831–1884	Succeeded by George Stanley Byng
