= Southill Park =

Grade I listed country house in Southill, Bedfordshire, England

Coordinates: 52°03′54″N 00°19′58″W

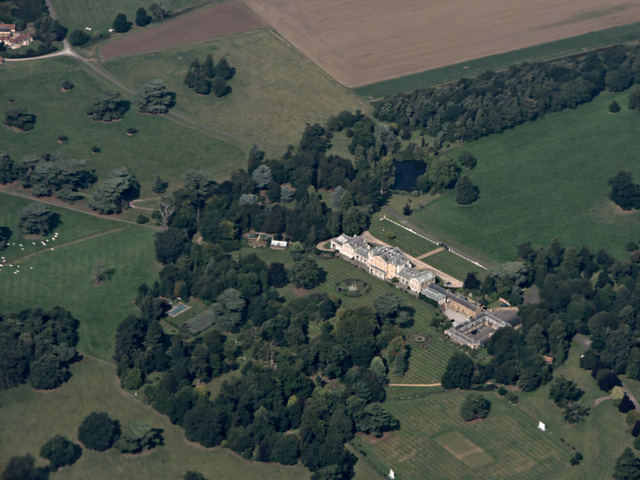
Southill Park from the air

Southill Park contains the site of late medieval Gastlings or Gastlyns Manor House and is the name given to a country house in Southill, Bedfordshire, its adjoining privately owned gardens and separate public parkland; it includes a lake and woodland. Its focal point is an early Georgian house, for disambiguation known as Southill Park House which is a heritage-listed building in the highest category (Grade I). The parkland has legal designations in heritage and plant or wildlife protection. Further structures in the grounds have heritage protection including the follies of a Tuscan architecture temple and a partially stone-faced bridge, both designed by Henry Holland.

== History ==
=== Owners and architects ===
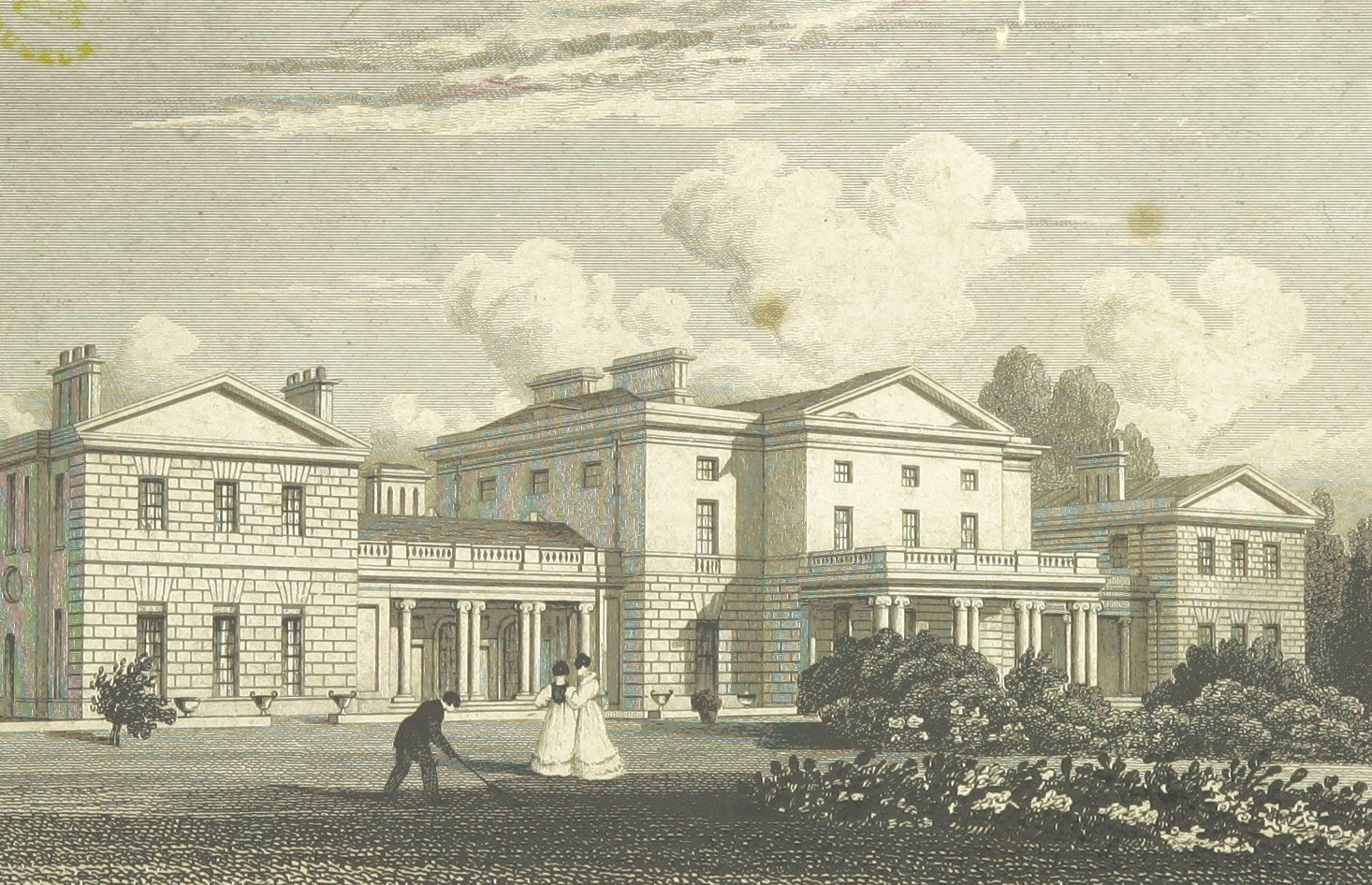
Old print of Southill Park

The present house was begun in the 1720s for George Byng, 1st Viscount Torrington (1663-1733). Its grounds were landscaped by Capability Brown in 1777.

It passed down in the Byng family via Pattee Byng, 2nd Viscount Torrington and the latter's brother George Byng, 3rd Viscount Torrington to George Byng, 4th Viscount Torrington, who sold the estate in 1795 to Samuel Whitbread (1720–1796), the brewer and founder of Whitbreads. The house passed to his descendants, including Samuel Whitbread (1764–1815), William Henry Whitbread, Samuel Charles Whitbread, Samuel Whitbread (1830–1915), Samuel Whitbread (Liberal politician) and Samuel Whitbread (Lord Lieutenant) who owned the house until his death in 2023. The house was extensively remodelled in the late 1790s for the second Samuel Whitbread to the designs of Henry Holland.

=== Forerunner ===
Gastlyns, Gastlynbury or Gastlings Manor (Manor House and Park) is first recorded by inference by tracing a holding of the Domesday Book of the same size and location to one perhaps early 13th century overlord "Albreda", the younger sister of Walter Espec, who married Geoffrey de Trailly and the manor falling within the Honour of Trailly until 1438. However many successive tenants or more accurately today called long lessees held it — for example the "tenant" in 1250 held it by a yearly rent of 6d. (old pence) and a pair of gilt spurs. He was succeeded by his daughter Joan who married Sir Geoffrey Gastlyn, from whom the predecessor house derived its distinctive name.

In 1667 John Thurgood conveyed the manor to Sir John Keeling (also known as Kelyng). The Keeling family held the property until about 1707 when sold to Sir George Byng, who bought largely in Southill during the second decade of the 18th century, and was created Baron Byng, of Southill in 1721.

== Features of the house and landscape park ==
House

A 1930-written article in Country Life by Christopher Hussey describes the house as "a complete work of art to an extent that is true of few other great English homes of any period ... (It) must be acknowledged the classic example of the most civilised decade in the whole range of English domestic architecture."

Southill Park House was built c. 1720-1729 then remodelled in the 1790s; it is listed at grade I. It is towards the village and on a rise overlooking its northern lands and lake. It consists of a brick-built mass with outer pavilions and linking wings. The house was stone-clad, ashlar-laid, in 1796 by employment of Henry Holland who moved the entrance to the north, constructed colonnaded loggias to the south and built the eastern "service wing". A late 19th century brick-built orangery, with stone pilasters and a hipped glass roof is attached.

The stable block designed by Henry Holland, separately listed adjoins constructed as part of the remodelling of the house in the late 1790s using white brick and slated mansard roof. It has a courtyard, with an entrance archway through the north range from the outer courtyard, which is entered through a Gothic archway off the main drive.

Estate

A raised mound marks the site of the earlier house 400m north-east of the replacement and close north-west to Southill parish church, within The Menagerie woodland; it was demolished c. 1720-1729.

The focal point of the northern area is a 15-hectare (37-acre) lake. This has an island towards the south end, and at the north bank its discharging stream is covered by Smeaton's Bridge designed by Henry Holland — a red brick arch and abutments with a decorative stone-faced park-facing side. At the head of a broad lawn running down to the north shore of the lake, flanked by woodland, stands the Holland-designed Fishing Temple, a decorative, brick, Tuscan style temple flanked by screen walls to the west and east, with an imposing porte-cochère lakeside, and a small cottage attached to the west. Both structures are separately heritage-listed, at Grade II and II* respectively. The lake acts as a spawning ground for fish and is on a sub-tributary of the Great Ouse, via the Ivel.

The list entry summarises the terrain:

The land is slightly undulating, with the house sited on a high point within the park. The setting is largely agricultural and wooded with the village of Southill adjacent to the east, the hamlet of Ireland to the west, and the designed landscapes of Chicksands Priory...3km to the south-west, and Old Warden Park...adjacent to the north.

— National Heritage List for England

== Heritage designation ==
The garden is listed by statutory body Historic England for special historic interest in the slightly enhanced category (Grade II*)

== Nature designation ==
The parkland is part of a Site of Special Scientific Interest, Southill Lake and Woods.
