= Viscount Torrington =

Viscountcy in the Peerage of Great Britain

Viscountcy of Torrington
- Arms of the Viscounts Torrington Blazon Arms: Quarterly, sable and argent, in the 1st quarter a lion rampant of the second. Crest: An heraldic antelope ermine. Supporters: Dexter, an heraldic antelope ermine, armed, unguled, maned and tufted or, standing on a ship’s gun proper; sinister, a sea-horse also proper also on a ship’s gun.
- Creation date: 21 September 1721
- Created by: George I
- Peerage: Peerage of Great Britain
- First holder: Sir George Byng, 1st Baronet
- Present holder: Timothy Byng, 11th Viscount Torrington
- Heir presumptive: Colin Hugh Cranmer-Byng
- Remainder to: Heirs male of the first viscount's body lawfully begotten
- Subsidiary titles: Baron Byng
- Seat: Great Hunts Place
- Motto: Tuebor ("I will defend").

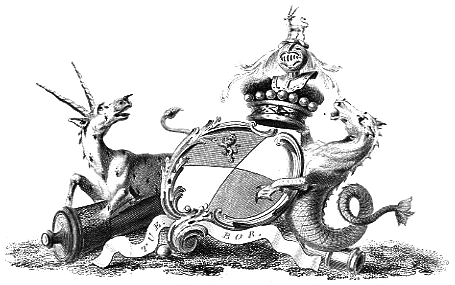
18th century rendition of the Torrington arms by Charles Catton

Viscount Torrington is a title in the Peerage of Great Britain.

== History ==
The Peerage was created in 1721 for the statesman Sir George Byng, 1st Baronet, along with the subsidiary title Baron Byng, of Southill in the County of Bedford, also in the Peerage of Great Britain. He had already been created a baronet, of Wrotham in the County of Kent, in the Baronetage of Great Britain on 15 November 1715.

His eldest son, the second Viscount, represented Plymouth and Bedfordshire in the House of Commons and later served as Captain of the Yeomen of the Guard from 1746 to 1747. His younger brother, the third Viscount, was a major-general in the Army. His grandson, the sixth Viscount, was a vice-admiral in the Royal Navy. His son, the seventh Viscount, served as Governor of Ceylon between 1847 and 1850.

On his death, the titles passed to his nephew, the eighth Viscount, the son of Honourable Robert Barlow Palmer Byng, third son of the sixth Viscount. He was succeeded by his son, the ninth Viscount. However, this line of the family failed on his death in 1944 and the titles passed to the late Viscount's first cousin, the tenth Viscount. As of 2013, the titles are held by the latter's grandson, the eleventh Viscount, who succeeded on his grandfather's death in 1961.

Several other members of the Byng family have also gained distinction. The Hon. Robert Byng, third son of the first Viscount, was Member of Parliament for Plymouth. He was the father of George Byng, radical Member of Parliament for Middlesex. He was the father of George Byng, Father of the House of Commons, and John Byng, 1st Earl of Strafford. The soldier Julian Hedworth George Byng, 1st Viscount Byng of Vimy, was the youngest son of the second Earl of Strafford.

Admiral the Hon. John Byng, who was controversially court-martialled and shot in 1757, was the fourth son of the first Viscount Torrington. He was the only British admiral ever executed after a court-martial.

The family seat is Great Hunts Place, near Winchester, Hampshire. The traditional burial place of the Viscounts Torrington is the Byng Vault at the Church of All Saints, Southill, Bedfordshire.

Other notable members of the family were Captain Launcelot Alfred Cranmer-Byng (1872-1945), sinologist and translator of ancient Chinese poetry, and his brother, author and playwright Hugh Edward Cranmer-Byng (1873–1949).

== Viscounts Torrington (1721) ==
- George Byng, 1st Viscount Torrington (1663–1733)
- Pattee Byng, 2nd Viscount Torrington (1699–1747)
- George Byng, 3rd Viscount Torrington (1701–1750)
- George Byng, 4th Viscount Torrington (1740–1812)
- John Byng, 5th Viscount Torrington (1743–1813)
- George Byng, 6th Viscount Torrington (1768–1831)
- George Byng, 7th Viscount Torrington (1812–1884)
- George Stanley Byng, 8th Viscount Torrington (1841–1889)
- George Master Byng, 9th Viscount Torrington (1886–1944)
- Arthur Stanley Byng, 10th Viscount Torrington (1876–1961)
- Timothy Howard St George Byng, 11th Viscount Torrington (born 1943), grandson of the 10th Viscount Torrington.

The heir presumptive is the present holder's cousin Colin Hugh Cranmer-Byng (born 1960).

== See also ==
- Earl of Strafford (1847 creation)
- Viscount Byng of Vimy

Baronetage of Great Britain
| Preceded by Chaplin baronets | Byng baronets of Wrotham; 15 November 1715 | Succeeded by Sloane baronets |
