= George Byng, 3rd Viscount Torrington =

British Army officer

Major-General George Byng, 3rd Viscount Torrington (21 September 1701 – 7 April 1750), styled The Honourable George Byng from 1721 to 1747, was a British Army officer.

== Origins ==
He was the 2nd surviving son of Admiral George Byng, 1st Viscount Torrington (1663–1733), of Southill Park in Bedfordshire.

== Career ==
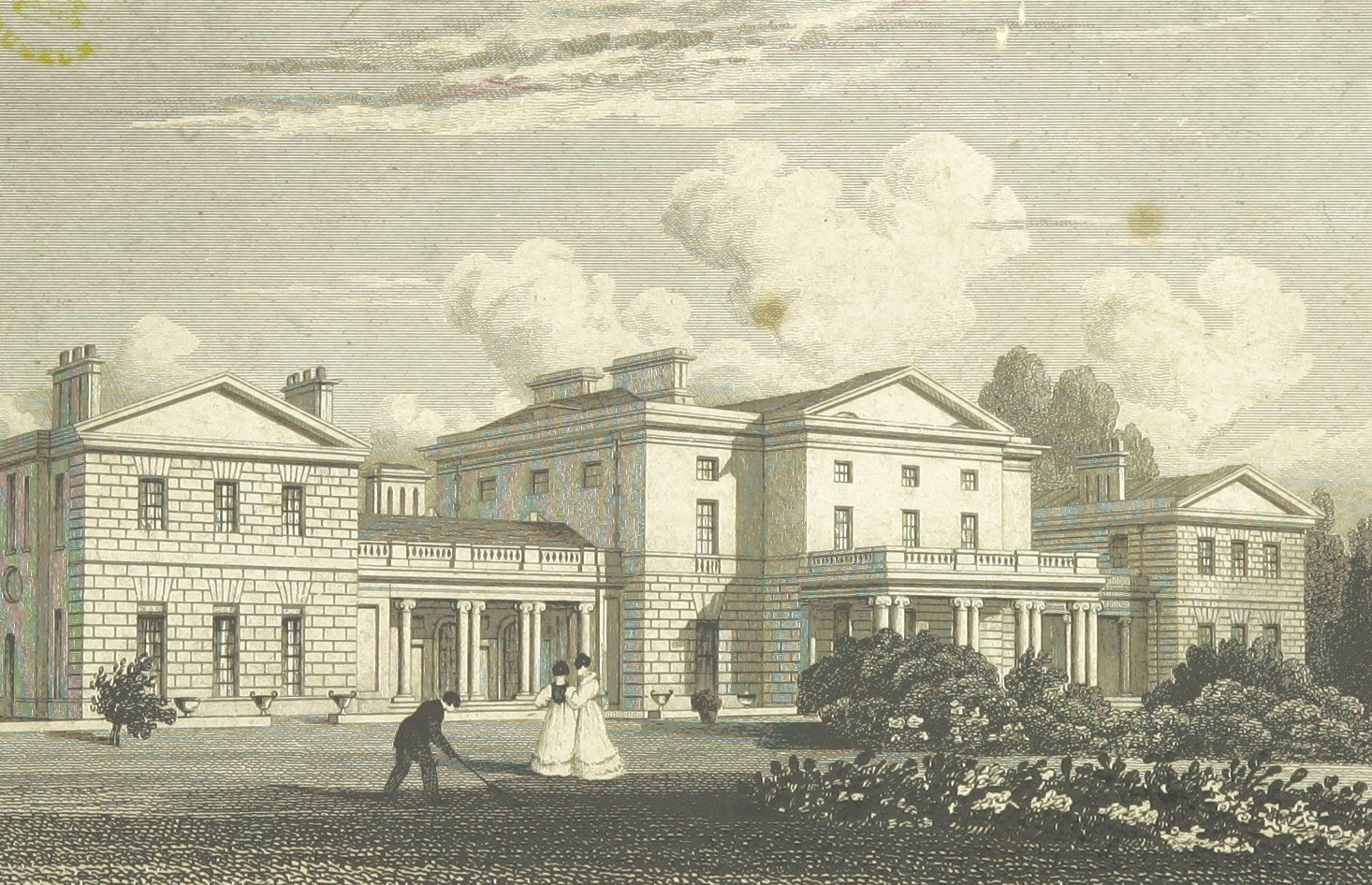
Southill Park

He succeeded his childless elder brother Pattee Byng, 2nd Viscount Torrington (1699–1747) to the viscountcy and the family seat at Southill Park in Bedfordshire. From 1742 to 1748, Byng was Colonel of the 4th Regiment of Marines. From 1749 to 1750 he was Colonel of the 48th Regiment of Foot. He ended his military career with the rank of major general.

== Marriage and children ==
On 21 August 1736 he married Elizabeth Daniel, a granddaughter of Sir Peter Daniel, by whom he had two children:

- George Byng, 4th Viscount Torrington (1740–1812)
- John Byng, 5th Viscount Torrington (1743–1813)

== Death and burial ==
He died on 7 April 1750 and was buried in the Byng Mausoleum in the Church of All Saints in Southill, Bedfordshire, built for the burial of his father.

== See also ==
- Viscount Torrington

== Arms ==
Coat of arms of George Byng, 3rd Viscount Torrington
Coronet That of a viscount. Crest An heraldic antelope ermine. Escutcheon Quarterly, sable and argent, in the 1st quarter a lion rampant of the second. Supporters Dexter, an heraldic antelope ermine, armed, unguled, maned and tufted or, standing on a ship’s gun proper; sinister, a sea-horse also proper also on a ship’s gun. Motto Tuebor (I will defend).

Military offices
Preceded by John Wynyard	Colonel of Viscount Torrington's Regiment of Marines; 1742–1748	Regiment disbanded
Preceded by Hon. Henry Seymour Conway	Colonel of the Viscount Torrington's Regiment of Foot; 1749–1750	Succeeded by The Earl of Home
Peerage of Great Britain
Preceded by Pattee Byng	Viscount Torrington; 1747–1750	Succeeded by George Byng
