= George Byng, 6th Viscount Torrington =

Vice-Admiral The Right Honourable The Viscount Torrington FRS
- Coat of Arms of the Viscounts Torrington
- Born: 5 January 1768; London
- Died: 18 June 1831 (aged 63)
- Military career
- Allegiance: Kingdom of Great Britain; United Kingdom
- Branch: Royal Navy
- Service years: 1778–1831
- Rank: Vice-Admiral of the White
- Commands: HMS Ferret; HMS Artois; HMS Redoubt; HMS Mercury; HMS Galatea; HMS Texel; HMS Malabar; HMS Belliqueux; HMS Warrior
- Conflicts: American Revolutionary War: Battle of Ushant; Battle of Porto Praya; French Revolutionary Wars: Newfoundland expedition; Napoleonic Wars: Battle of Blaauwberg; Raid on Batavia; Mauritius campaign
- Awards: Military Order of William; Doctor of Civil Law; Fellow of the Royal Society

Vice-Admiral George Byng, 6th Viscount Torrington, FRS (5 January 1768 – 18 June 1831) was a Royal Navy officer who commanded HMS Cumberland, the ship which returned King William I to the Netherlands from his exile in London, for which service he was appointed by the king to the Military Order of William.

== Early life ==
George Byng was born the eldest son of Colonel the Honourable John Byng and his wife Bridget, the daughter of Commodore Arthur Forrest, in London on 5 January 1768. He was initially educated at Greenwich but was then moved to a seminary at Paddington where he completed his education in preparation for joining the Royal Navy, as had been planned for him from an early age.

== Naval career ==
Byng joined the Royal Navy on 23 February 1778, embarking on the 74-gun ship of the line HMS Thunderer as a midshipman. Thunderer made up part of the fleet of Admiral Augustus Keppel, and on 27 July Byng saw his first action at the indecisive Battle of Ushant. In 1780 he transferred to the 32-gun frigate HMS Alarm, but soon after he moved again, joining the 32-gun frigate HMS Active. In her Byng fought at the Battle of Porto Praya on 16 April 1781. After the battle Active was detached from her squadron as part of a convoy escort sailing to the East Indies Station; when she arrived there Byng was taken on board the 74-gun ship of the line HMS Superb, which was the flagship of Rear-Admiral Sir Edward Hughes. Staying in the ship, Byng subsequently served at two of the battles fought between Hughes and the French admiral Pierre André de Suffren, coming very close to being killed in the latter of the two when the gun crew he was commanding were all cut down by the impact of a cannon ball, but Byng escaped with only a minor splinter injury.

In September 1783 the Anglo-French War ended and Hughes returned home. Byng, however, did not go with him and instead transferred to the 74-gun ship of the line HMS Defence, the flagship of Commodore Andrew Mitchell. He finally returned home from the East Indies in Defence in December 1785. Upon arriving home Byng passed his examination for promotion to lieutenant but did not immediately receive the advancement, instead joining the 50-gun fourth rate HMS Jupiter, which was the flagship of Commodore William Parker on the Leeward Islands Station. In 1789 Parker was due to leave the Leeward Islands, but before he did so a position for a lieutenant came available, and Byng was one of two candidates for it. Parker had Byng and the other midshipman, Joseph Bingham, throw a die to decide who received the promotion; Bingham won and left with Parker as a lieutenant.

Parker was replaced on station by Rear-Admiral Sir John Laforey, who took Byng on board his flagship, the 50-gun fourth rate HMS Trusty. In September 1790 Byng finally received his promotion to lieutenant, joining the 16-gun sloop HMS Shark, in which he then sailed home to England. In early 1791 Byng was appointed to serve on the 74-gun ship of the line HMS Illustrious, and from her he moved to become first lieutenant of the 32-gun frigate HMS Druid, in which he served on several successful anti-smuggling patrols off the coast of England. Byng was next appointed to serve as a lieutenant on board the 98-gun ship of the line HMS Impregnable, the flagship of Rear-Admiral Benjamin Caldwell. Byng was still on the books of Impregnable when she fought in the Battle of the Glorious First of June in 1794, but beforehand he had been brought down with a sickness and invalided ashore, thus missing the battle. He recovered from his illness and re-joined Impregnable upon her return to port, and in October of the same year was promoted to commander.

Byng was immediately given command of the 12-gun sloop HMS Ferret to serve in the North Sea. While on station for a period after this he temporarily commanded the 38-gun frigate HMS Artois while her captain, Captain Sir Edmund Nagle, was away. On 19 June 1795 Byng was promoted to post-captain and given the 20-gun floating battery HMS Redoubt, stationed in the River Tyne. While serving there he put an end to a cabal of seamen intending to extort higher wages from their employers by violently stopping any ships from going to sea until their demands were met, for which he was thanked by Newcastle Trinity House and the merchants of the locality.

Some time after this Byng was transferred from Redoubt to command the 28-gun frigate HMS Mercury. He served in her on the Newfoundland Station under the command of Vice-Admiral Sir James Wallace. In August 1796 the station was attacked by an expedition commanded by the French Rear-Admiral Joseph de Richery which included seven ships of the line and three frigates. With only a 50-gun fourth rate, two frigates and two sloops, the British succeeded in stopping the force from enacting a full invasion of the settlement, and the expedition left in the following month. In 1797 Byng left Mercury and instead joined the 32-gun frigate HMS Galatea to serve in the English Channel and Irish Sea.

Byng patrolled these areas in Galatea for the rest of the French Revolutionary Wars, during which period he captured several armed French vessels, including the 14-gun corvette Ranger, and recaptured the West Indiaman Kenyon which was worth £40,000. In 1801 Galatea was patrolling in the Bay of Biscay when she was caught in a hurricane and dismasted, only narrowly avoiding sinking completely, although only one man of her crew was killed in the storm. Towards the end of the year, soon before the Peace of Amiens began, Byng was made a burgess of Plymouth as a mark of respect for his success in surviving this incident. When the Peace came into effect in the following year Galatea was stationed off the coast of Ireland on anti-smuggling duties, and Byng stayed on board her there until May 1802 when he was forced to resign his command due to increasingly bad health, brought about by the strain put on him while sailing during the previous winter.

Having regained his health while on half pay, Byng applied for a new command at the start of the Napoleonic Wars in May 1803. He was given the 64-gun ship of the line HMS Texel on the River Medway, and when there assumed command of the blockships stationed there. In August 1804 Byng was moved into the 50-gun fourth rate HMS Malabar and he commanded her until March 1805 when he transferred to the 64-gun ship of the line HMS Belliqueux. In autumn of the same year he sailed as part of a squadron conveying a small army under Major-General Sir David Baird to the Dutch Cape Colony, where on 18 January 1806 the force succeeded in forcing the capitulation of the settlement; for the purposes of the main attack Byng had landed in command of a battalion of marines with which he commanded a mobile artillery battery. He was highly commended for his "perseverance and determination" during the expedition.

A number of East India Company ships had assisted at the Cape, and as these were no longer needed, Byng was sent to convoy them to Madras. When the ships arrived there, their captains gifted him with a £100 piece of plate in gratitude. Belliqueux then joined the East Indies Station, serving in the squadron of Rear-Admiral Sir Edward Pellew. On 27 November they captured or destroyed a frigate, seven brigs, and twenty smaller vessels at the Dutch settlement of Batavia in a raid. In this action Byng was praised by Pellew, who signalled to him saying "Your zeal I have noticed". Byng stayed in the East Indies after this, but little of interest occurred until he was appointed a commodore in 1809 and given charge over a convoy containing an invasion force coming from Bombay to attack Rodriguez Island as the start of the Mauritius campaign. The Bombay government thanked Byng with a gift of £300 for this service. Byng and Belliqueux finally left the East Indies Station in June 1810 when he was ordered to go to China to assist in protecting British trade sailing from there.

Byng sailed from Macao in convoy with seven East Indiamen on 14 February 1811 and arrived with them at Saint Helena on 15 May, where he joined with another convoy of merchant ships and continued on to England, arriving in the Downs on 8 August. The East India Company rewarded Byng was this service with a gift of 1,000 guineas. Soon after this Belliqueux was paid off at Chatham and the First Lord of the Admiralty, Charles Philip Yorke, offered Byng a choice of commanding either of two new 74-gun ships of the line that were to be commissioned soon afterwards. Byng however requested that he instead be given command of an older ship of the line that had a design more favourable to him, and he was subsequently given the 74-gun ship of the line HMS Warrior.

On 8 January 1813 Byng succeeded to the title of Viscount Torrington after the death of his father, who in turn had inherited it from his brother George only 14 days before. Despite this Byng continued to serve in Warrior, mostly in the Baltic Sea and North Sea. In November of the same year the Netherlands was liberated, allowing its monarchy to return. Byng was chosen to convey King William across the Channel, and Warrior embarked the king in the Downs on 25 November. They landed the royal party at Scheveling on 30 November and Byng then accompanied it to the Hague. For his services to the king, Byng was created a Knight of the Military Order of William by him. Having afterwards returned to Warrior, Byng escorted a convoy of merchant ships to the West Indies, and while on this long voyage he was promoted to rear-admiral in absentia on 4 June 1814.

Byng did not serve at sea again after the end of the Napoleonic Wars and in fact declined the position of Commander-in-Chief, Leeward Islands in 1818, reasoning that his health had deteriorated too much through his long years of foreign service and he was too busy with his growing family to take up any more appointments.

== Marriages and children ==
He married twice:

- Firstly on 8 February 1793 to Elizabeth Langmead (d. 1810).
- Secondly on 5 October 1811 to Frances Harriet Barlow (d. 1868), by whom he had children including:
  - George Byng, 7th Viscount Torrington (1812–1884), eldest son and heir, a British diplomat who served as Governor of Ceylon between 1847 and 1850.
  - Hilare Caroline Byng (1815–1889), who married William Hutcheon Hall in 1845

== Arms ==
Coat of arms of George Byng, 6th Viscount Torrington
| Coronet That of a viscount. Crest An heraldic antelope ermine. Escutcheon Quarterly, sable and argent, in the 1st quarter a lion rampant of the second. Supporters Dexter, an heraldic antelope ermine, armed, unguled, maned and tufted or, standing on a ship’s gun proper; sinister, a sea-horse also proper also on a ship’s gun. Motto Tuebor (I will defend). |

Peerage of Great Britain
| Preceded by John Byng | Viscount Torrington; 1813–1831 | Succeeded by George Byng |
