= George Byng, 1st Viscount Torrington =

Royal Navy officer and politician (1663–1733)

Admiral of the Fleet The Right Honourable The Viscount Torrington KB PC
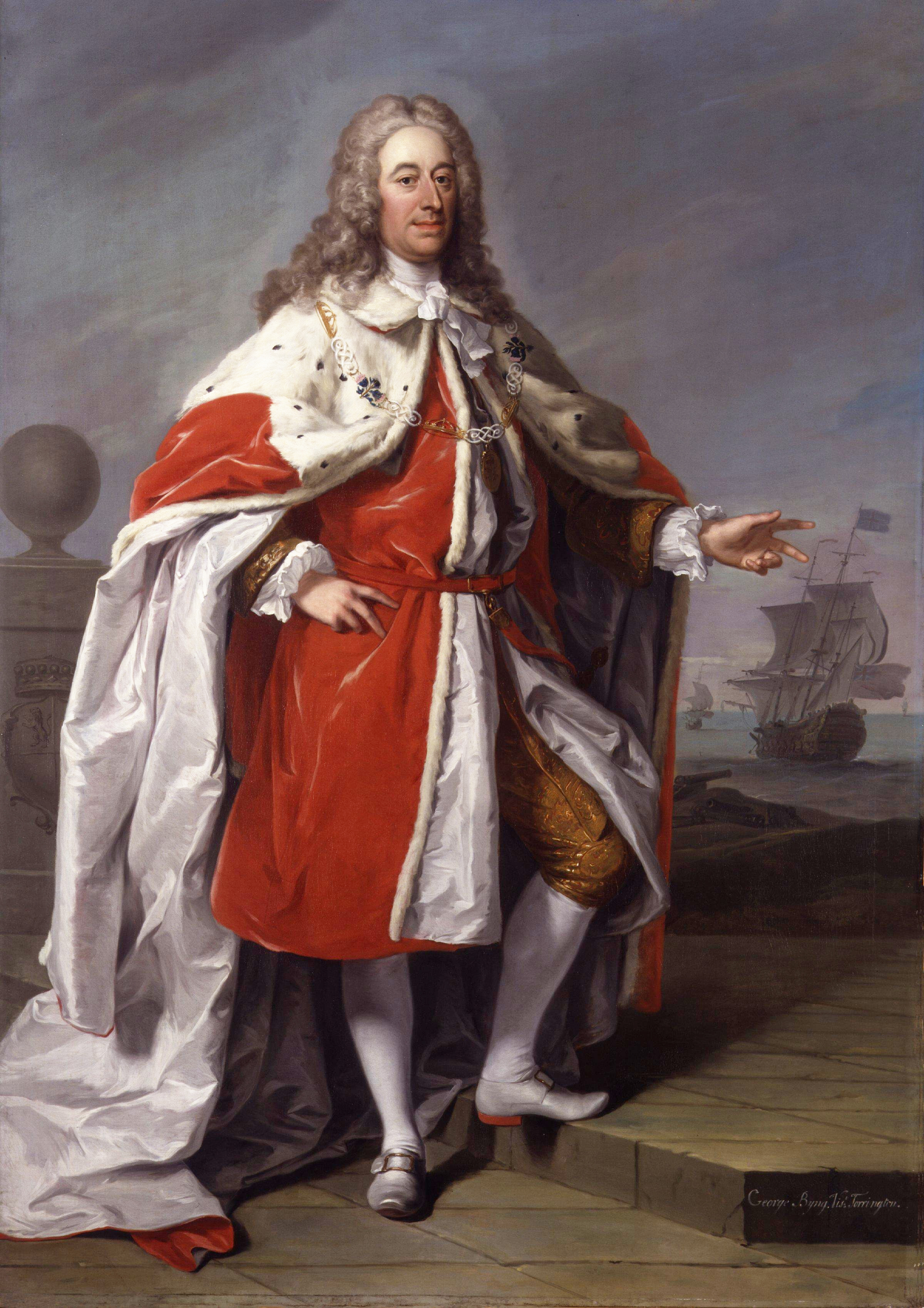
- Portrait by Jeremiah Davison, c. 1730
- Born: 27 January 1663; Wrotham, Kent
- Died: 17 January 1733 (aged 69); Southill, Bedfordshire
- Burial place: Church of All Saints, Southill, Bedfordshire
- Military career
- Allegiance: England (1678–1707); Great Britain (1707–1733)
- Branch: Royal Navy
- Service years: 1678–1733
- Rank: Admiral of the Fleet
- Commands: HMS Constant Warwick; HMS Hope; HMS Duchess; HMS Royal Oak; HMS Britannia; HMS Nassau; Mediterranean Fleet
- Conflicts: Nine Years' War; Battle of Beachy Head (1690); War of the Spanish Succession; Battle of Vigo Bay; Capture of Gibraltar; Battle of Málaga (1704); Siege of Toulon (1707); War of the Quadruple Alliance; Battle of Cape Passaro
- Awards: Knight Companion of the Order of the Bath

Admiral of the Fleet George Byng, 1st Viscount Torrington, KB, PC (27 January 1663 – 17 January 1733) was a Royal Navy officer and politician who represented Plymouth in the English and British House of Commons from 1705 to 1721. While still a lieutenant, he delivered a letter from various captains to William of Orange, who had just landed at Torbay, assuring the Prince of the captains' support; the Prince gave Byng a response which ultimately led to the Royal Navy switching allegiance to the Prince and the Glorious Revolution of November 1688.

As a captain, Byng saw action at the Battle of Vigo Bay, when the French fleet was defeated, during the War of the Spanish Succession. As a flag officer, he led the bombardment squadron while serving under Admiral Sir George Rooke at the Anglo-Dutch capture of Gibraltar and then took part in the Battle of Málaga at a later stage in the same war.

Byng was sent to the Mediterranean to thwart any attempt by the Spanish to take Sicily. He encountered a Spanish fleet at Naples and, after pursuing it down the Strait of Messina, sent ahead his fastest ships causing the Spanish fleet to split in two. In the ensuing action, known as the Battle of Cape Passaro, the Spanish fleet was dealt a crushing blow at an early and critical stage of the War of the Quadruple Alliance. He went on to serve in a series of high-ranking positions in the Admiralty during the reign of King George II.

== Early career ==
George Byng was born in Kent village of Wrotham on 27 January 1663. The son of John Byng and Philadelphia Byng (née Johnson), Byng joined the Royal Navy as a King's Letter Boy in May 1678. He initially served in HMS Swallow and then transferred to HMS Reserve in November 1678 and then to HMS Mary Rose in June 1679. Byng sailed onboard HMS Phoenix to Tangier in Summer 1680 and, after a short period of service with the English Army's 2nd Tangier Regiment, he rejoined the Royal Navy as a lieutenant on 23 February 1684 and assigned to HMS Oxford before returning to Phoenix in which he sailed to the East Indies on a mission to put down a rebellion led by Richard Keigwin in Bombay. He transferred to HMS Mordaunt in May 1688 and to HMS Defiance in September 1688.

In October 1688 Byng, still a lieutenant, delivered a letter from several Royal Navy captains to William of Orange, who had just landed at Torbay, assuring William of the captains' support; William gave Byng a response which ultimately led to the Royal Navy switching allegiance as part of the Glorious Revolution of November 1688. Promoted to captain on 22 December 1688, he was given command of HMS Constant Warwick before transferring to the command of HMS Hope in May 1690 in which he saw action at the Battle of Beachy Head in July 1690 during the Nine Years' War. He transferred to the command of HMS Duchess in September 1690 and to HMS Royal Oak in January 1691 before becoming Flag Captain to Admiral Edward Russell in HMS Britannia in December 1693.

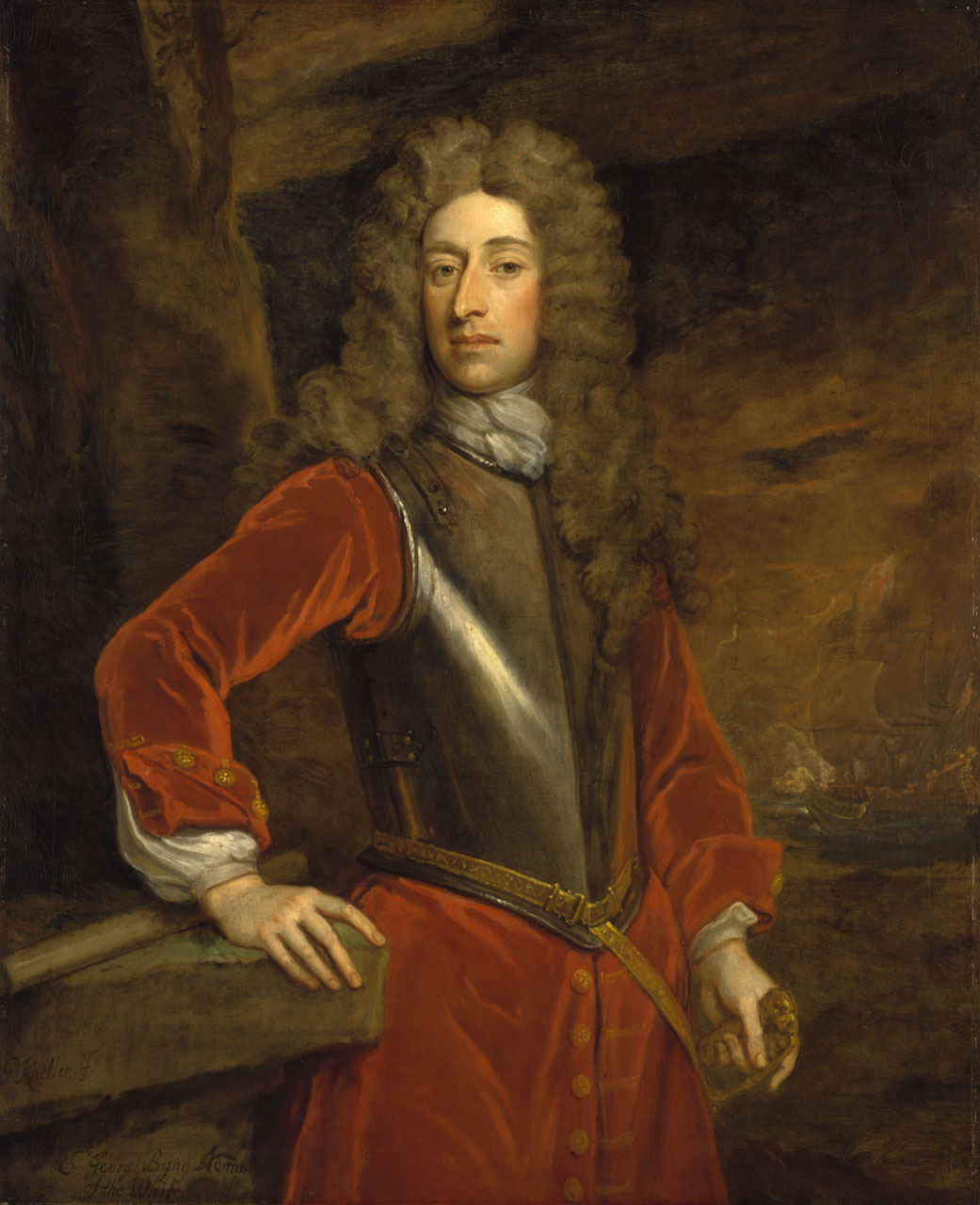
c. 1700 portrait of Byng by Godfrey Kneller

Byng was given command of HMS Nassau in June 1702 and participated in the Battle of Vigo Bay on 23 October as part of the War of the Spanish Succession.

== Senior command ==
Promoted to Rear-Admiral of the Red on 12 March 1703, Byng became third-in-command of the Mediterranean Fleet under Admiral Sir Cloudesley Shovell with his flag in HMS Ranelagh later that month. He led the bombardment squadron while serving under Admiral Sir George Rooke at the Anglo-Dutch capture of Gibraltar on 1–4 August 1704 and then took part in the Battle of Málaga on 24 August. Knighted on 22 October, and promoted to Vice-Admiral of the Blue on 24 January 1705, he was elected Member of Parliament for Plymouth later that year.

Byng became Commander-in-Chief, Portsmouth, with his flag in HMS Royal Anne, in late 1705 and then took part in the bombardment of Alicante in June 1706. After taking part in the siege of Toulon in July 1707 and, while sailing aboard his flagship HMS Royal Anne, Byng was present during the Scilly naval disaster of 1707 in October when Shovell and four of his ships were lost, claiming the lives of nearly 2,000 men.

Promoted to Admiral of the Blue on 20 January 1708, Byng was promoted again to Admiral of the White on 1 January 1709 and became Commander-in-Chief, Mediterranean Fleet in the same month. He went on to join the Board of Admiralty led by Russell in November 1709. Byng was advanced to Senior Naval Lord on the Admiralty Board in October 1710. He stood down from the Admiralty Board in January 1714 but was reappointed, as Senior Naval Lord again, on Orford's return to the Admiralty in October 1714.

Byng took part in the suppression of the Jacobite rising of 1715 by cutting off James Francis Edward Stuart's supplies and for this he was created a baronet on 15 November 1715. In 1717 Byng was commanding the Baltic Fleet with full cooperation from Danish naval forces under Admiral Peter Raben.

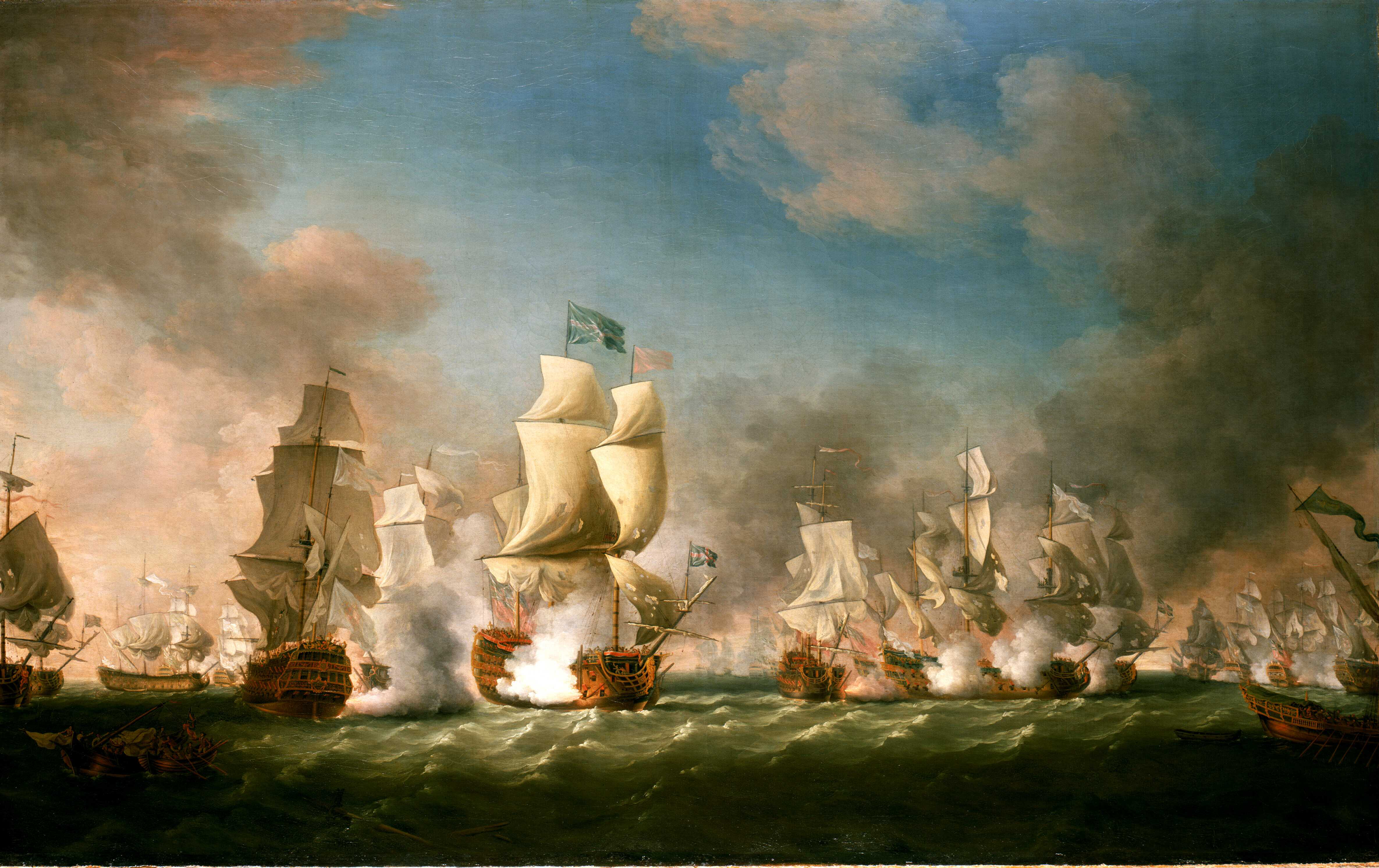
The Battle of Cape Passaro, at which Byng won a decisive victory

He was promoted to Admiral of the Fleet on 14 March 1718 and, with his flag in HMS Barfleur, he was sent out as Commander-in-Chief of the Mediterranean Fleet to thwart any attempt by the Spanish to gain or to consolidate their position in Sicily. He encountered the Spanish fleet at Naples and, after pursuing it down the Strait of Messina, sent ahead his fastest ships causing the Spanish fleet to split in two. In the ensuing action on 11 August 1718, which became known as the Battle of Cape Passaro, the Spanish fleet was devastated: eight ships of the line and seven frigates were captured, destroyed or scuttled at this early and critical stage of the War of the Quadruple Alliance.

Byng was then given power to negotiate with the various princes and states of Italy on behalf of the British crown. Following his return to England, Byng became both Treasurer of the Navy and Rear-Admiral of Great Britain on 21 October 1720. He was admitted to the Privy Council on 3 January 1721 and, having stepped down from the Admiralty Board in September 1721, was created Baron Byng of Southill in the county of Bedford, and 1st Viscount Torrington in Devon on 21 September 1721. He developed his estate at Southill Park in Bedfordshire in the 1720s.

Byng was installed as a Knight Companion of the Order of the Bath on 17 June 1725 and appointed First Lord of the Admiralty during the Walpole–Townshend Ministry in August 1727; in this role he was instrumental in the establishment of the Royal Naval College at Portsmouth.

== Marriage and progeny ==
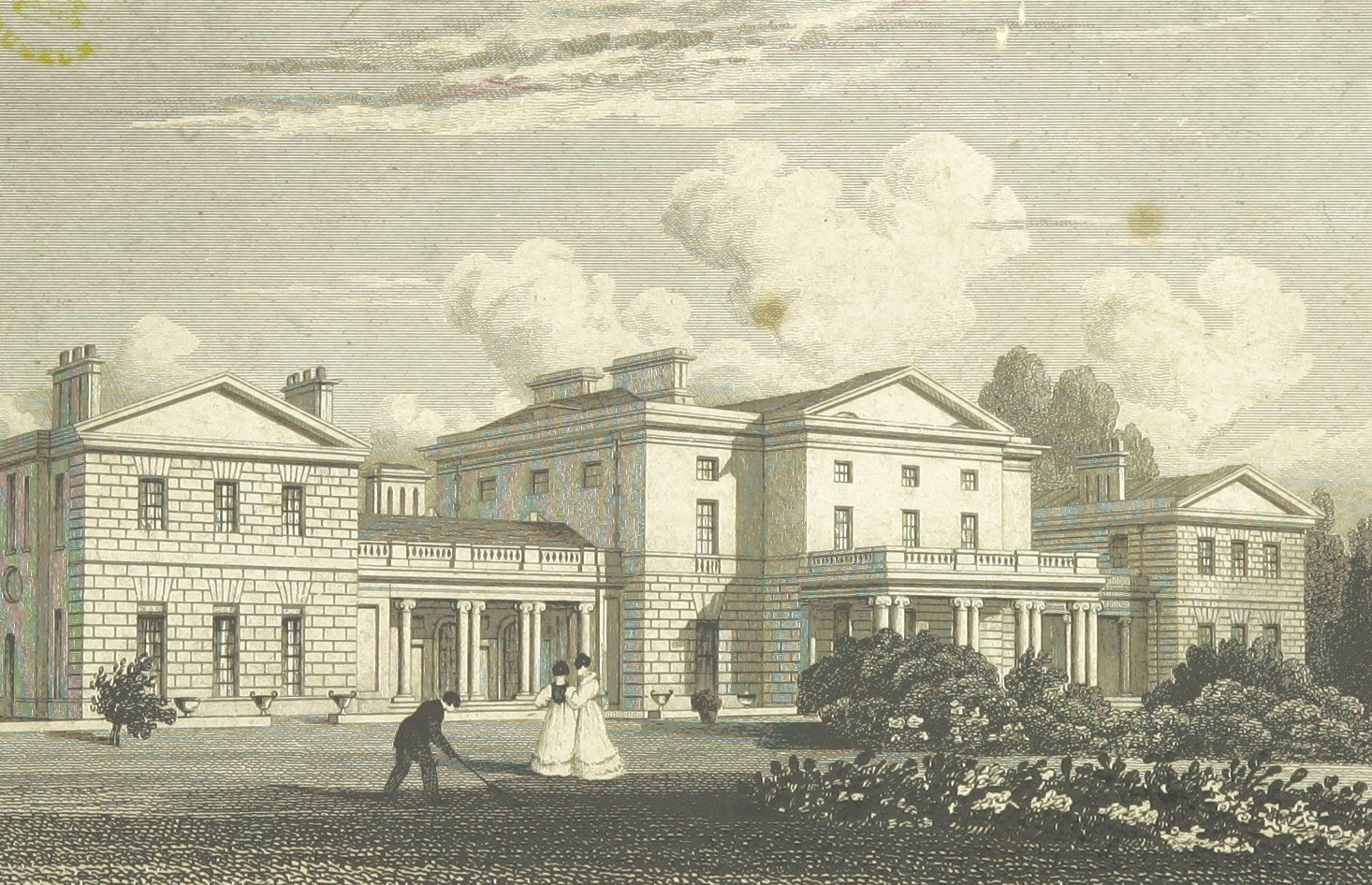
Southill Park, Byng's Bedfordshire country house

Byng was married at St Paul's, Covent Garden, on 6 March 1691 to Margaret Master, daughter of James Master of East Langdon in Kent. Together the couple had fifteen children (eleven sons and four daughters) of whom six lived to survive him:

- Pattee Byng (1699–1747), 2nd Viscount Torrington, died without surviving progeny.
- George Byng (1701–1750), 3rd Viscount Torrington
- Robert Byng (1703–1740), Governor of Barbados (1739–1740), from whom the Earls of Strafford stem.
- John Byng (1704–1757), Admiral controversially court-martialled and shot at the outbreak of the Seven Years' War in Europe.
- Edward Byng (1706–1756)
- Sarah Byng (1695–1775)

== Death and burial ==
Byng died on 17 January 1733 of a "Hecktick Cough" and was eventually buried in a vault within the newly constructed Byng Mausoleum attached to the north side of the Church of All Saints in the parish of Southill, Bedfordshire, in which parish was situated his residence of Southill Park. The mausoleum was constructed for his burial, with licence granted by the Bishop of Lincoln in 1733.

== Arms ==
Coat of arms of George Byng, 1st Viscount Torrington
Coronet That of a viscount. Crest An heraldic antelope ermine. Escutcheon Quarterly, sable and argent, in the 1st quarter a lion rampant of the second. Supporters Dexter, an heraldic antelope ermine, armed, unguled, maned and tufted or, standing on a ship’s gun proper; sinister, a sea-horse also proper also on a ship’s gun. Motto Tuebor (I will defend). Orders The Order of the Bath - Knight (KB).

Parliament of England
Preceded by Charles Trelawny; John Woolcombe	Member of Parliament for Plymouth; 1705–1707; With: Charles Trelawny	Succeeded by Parliament of Great Britain
Parliament of Great Britain
Preceded by Parliament of England	Member of Parliament for Plymouth; 1707–1721; With: Charles Trelawny to 1713; Sir John Rogers 1713–1721	Succeeded by Sir John Rogers; Pattee Byng
Military offices
Preceded by Sir John Leake	Senior Naval Lord; 1710–1712	Succeeded by Sir John Leake
Preceded by Sir John Leake	Senior Naval Lord; 1714–1717	Succeeded by Matthew Aylmer
Preceded by Matthew Aylmer	Senior Naval Lord; 1718–1721	Succeeded by Sir John Jennings
Preceded by Sir Matthew Aylmer	Admiral of the Fleet; 1718–1733	Succeeded by Sir John Norris
Political offices
Preceded by Richard Hampden	Treasurer of the Navy; 1720–1724	Succeeded by Pattee Byng
Preceded by The Earl of Berkeley	First Lord of the Admiralty; 1727–1733	Succeeded by Sir Charles Wager
Honorary titles
Preceded by Lord Aylmer	Rear-Admiral of Great Britain; 1720–1733	Succeeded by Sir John Jennings
Peerage of Great Britain
New creation	Viscount Torrington; 1721–1733	Succeeded by Pattee Byng
Baronetage of Great Britain
New creation	Baronet (of Southill); 1715–1733	Succeeded by Pattee Byng
