= Plymouth by-election =

Plymouth by-election may refer to:

- 1868 Plymouth by-election
- 1870 Plymouth by-election
- 1871 Plymouth by-election
- 1886 Plymouth by-election
- 1900 Plymouth by-election
- 1937 Plymouth Drake by-election
