= William Hawkins =

William, Bill, or Billy Hawkins may refer to:

== Arts and entertainment ==
- William Hawkins (priest) (1722–1801), English poet and dramatist
- William L. Hawkins (1895–1990), African-American folk artist
- William Hawkins (songwriter) (1940–2016), Canadian songwriter, musician and poet

== Business and industry ==
- William Hawkins (died 1589), English sea-captain and merchant
- William Hawkins (fl. c. 1600), English merchant
- Trip Hawkins (William Murray Hawkins III, born 1953), American entrepreneur
- William A. Hawkins (businessman) (born 1954), American businessman

== Law and politics ==
- William Hawkins (died c. 1554), English politician
- William Hawkins (serjeant-at-law) (1673–1746), English serjeant-at-law and legal writer
- William Hawkins (governor) (1777–1819), American governor of North Carolina
- William A. Hawkins (politician) (1812–1888), Wisconsin state legislator, Colorado pioneer
- William Warwick Hawkins (1816–1868), British politician
- Ashbie Hawkins (William Ashbie Hawkins, 1862–1941), African American lawyer
- William E. Hawkins (1863–1937), American jurist in Texas

== Others ==
- Bill Hawkins (cricketer) (1861–1930), New Zealand cricketer
- William D. Hawkins (1914–1943), American Marine
- Bill Hawkins (American football) (born 1966), American football player
- Billy C. Hawkins, American academic administrator

== Other uses ==
- Gibbeting of William Hawkins and Abraham Tull
