= Strete (disambiguation) =

Strete is a village in Devon, England.

Strete may also refer to:

- Strete Ralegh, a location in Devon, England
- Bobby "Werner" Strete (born 1966), American musician
- Cornelius van der Strete (died 1529), tapestry worker at the courts of Henry VII and Henry VIII of England
- Craig Strete (born 1950), American science fiction writer of Cherokee descent
- Henry Strete (by 1481–1535/36), Member of the Parliament of England for Plymouth in 1510
- John Strete (died c.1414), Member of the Parliament of England for Dover, and Mayor of Dover
- Richard Strete (died 1543), Anglican priest, archdeacon of Shropshire and of Derby
