= Rogers baronets =

Extinct baronetcy in the Baronetage of England

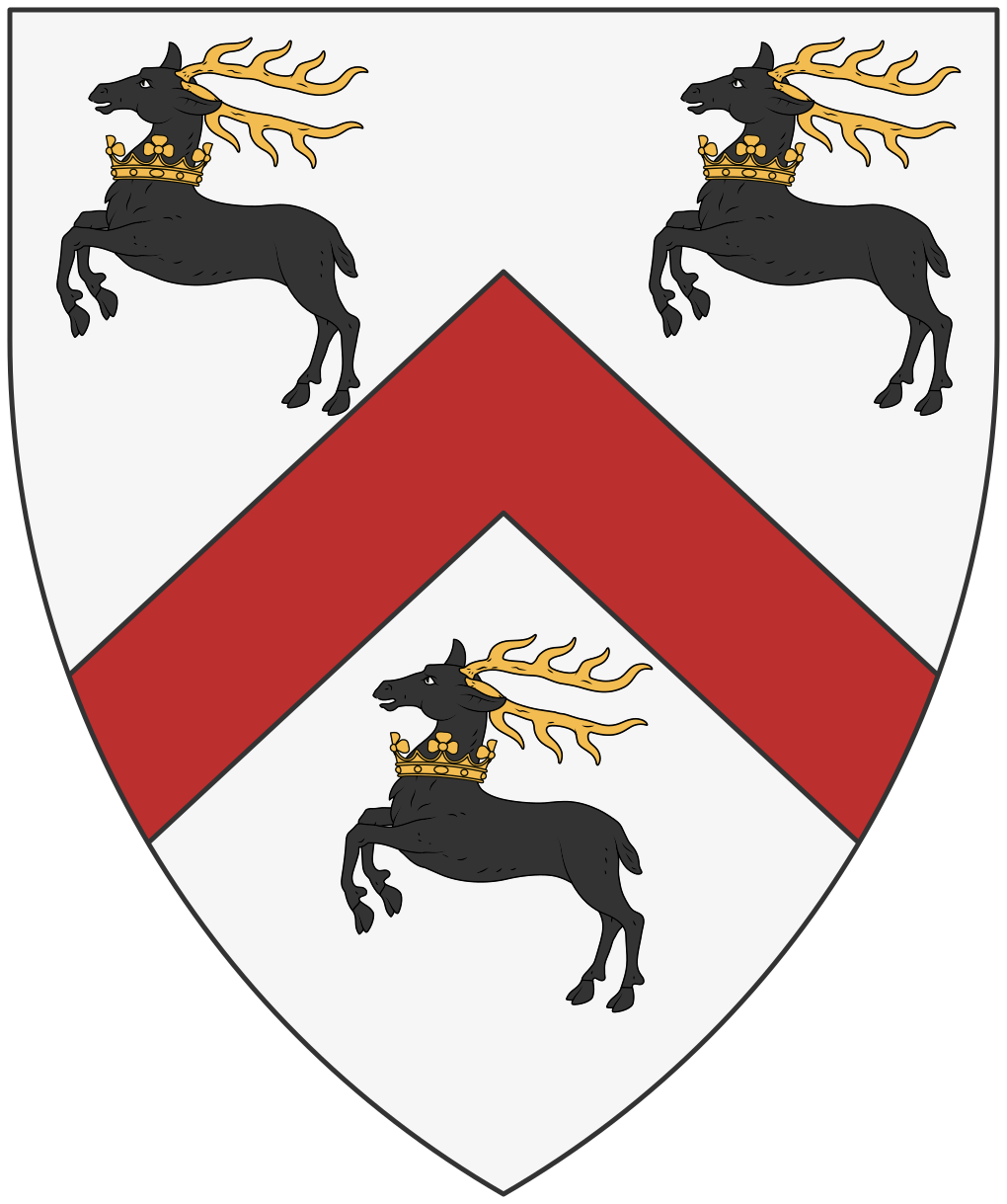
The coat of arms of the Rogers of Wisdome, sometime baronets and barons.

The Rogers Baronetcy, of Wisdome in the County of Devon, was a title in the Baronetage of England. It was created in 1699 for John Rogers, a merchant and Member of Parliament for Plymouth. His son, the second Baronet, and grandson, the third Baronet, also represented Plymouth in Parliament. The latter was childless and was succeeded by his younger brother, the fourth Baronet. He was a Captain in the Royal Navy. His son, the fifth Baronet, sat as Member of Parliament for Plymouth. He was succeeded by his eldest son, the sixth Baronet. He sat as Member of Parliament for Callington and was also a composer. He was unmarried and was succeeded by his younger brother, the seventh Baronet. The latter was succeeded by his eldest son, the eighth Baronet. He was a prominent civil servant and notably served as Permanent Under-Secretary of State for the Colonies from 1860 to 1871. In 1871 he was elevated to the Peerage of the United Kingdom as Baron Blachford, of Wisdome and of Blachford in the County of Devon (Blachford House, Cornwood, near Ivybridge). He died childless in 1889 when the barony became extinct. He was succeeded in the baronetcy by his younger brother, the ninth Baronet. The latter was in his turn succeeded by another brother, the tenth Baronet, on whose death in 1895 the baronetcy became extinct as well.

William Cooper Rogers (d. 1857), younger son of the fifth Baronet, was a Major-General in the British Army. Robert Henley Rogers (1783–1857), younger son of the fifth Baronet, was a Rear-Admiral in the Royal Navy.

== Rogers baronets, of Wisdome (1699) ==
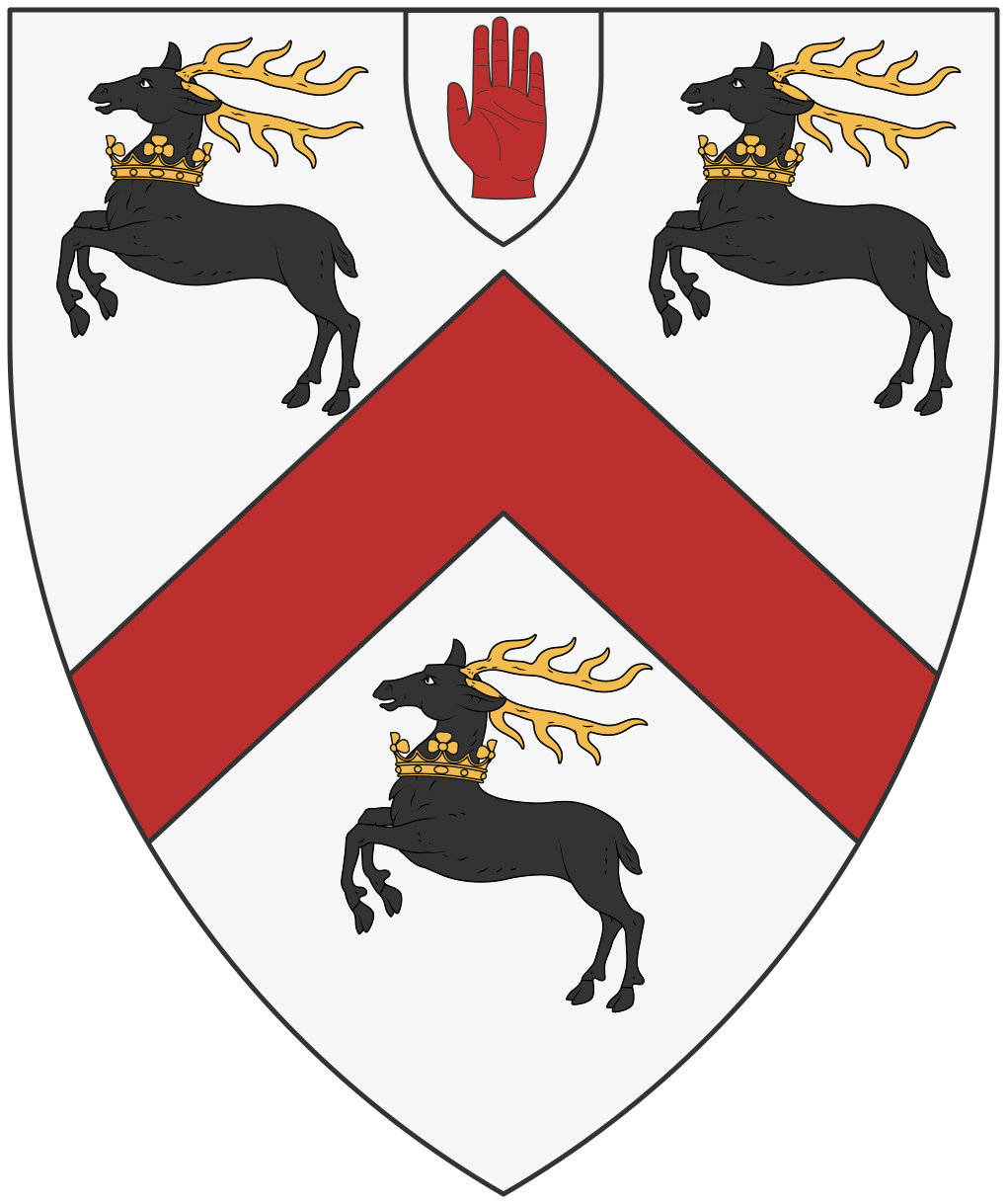
Arms of Rogers of Wisdome

- Sir John Rogers, 1st Baronet (c. 1649–1710)
- Sir John Rogers, 2nd Baronet (1676–1744)
- Sir John Rogers, 3rd Baronet (1708–1773)
- Sir Frederick Rogers, 4th Baronet (1716–1777)
- Sir Frederick Rogers, 5th Baronet (1746–1797)
- Sir John Leman Rogers, 6th Baronet (1780–1847)
- Sir Frederick Leman Rogers, 7th Baronet (1782–1851)
- Sir Frederick Rogers, 8th Baronet (1811–1889) (created Baron Blachford in 1871)

== Barons Blachford (1871) ==
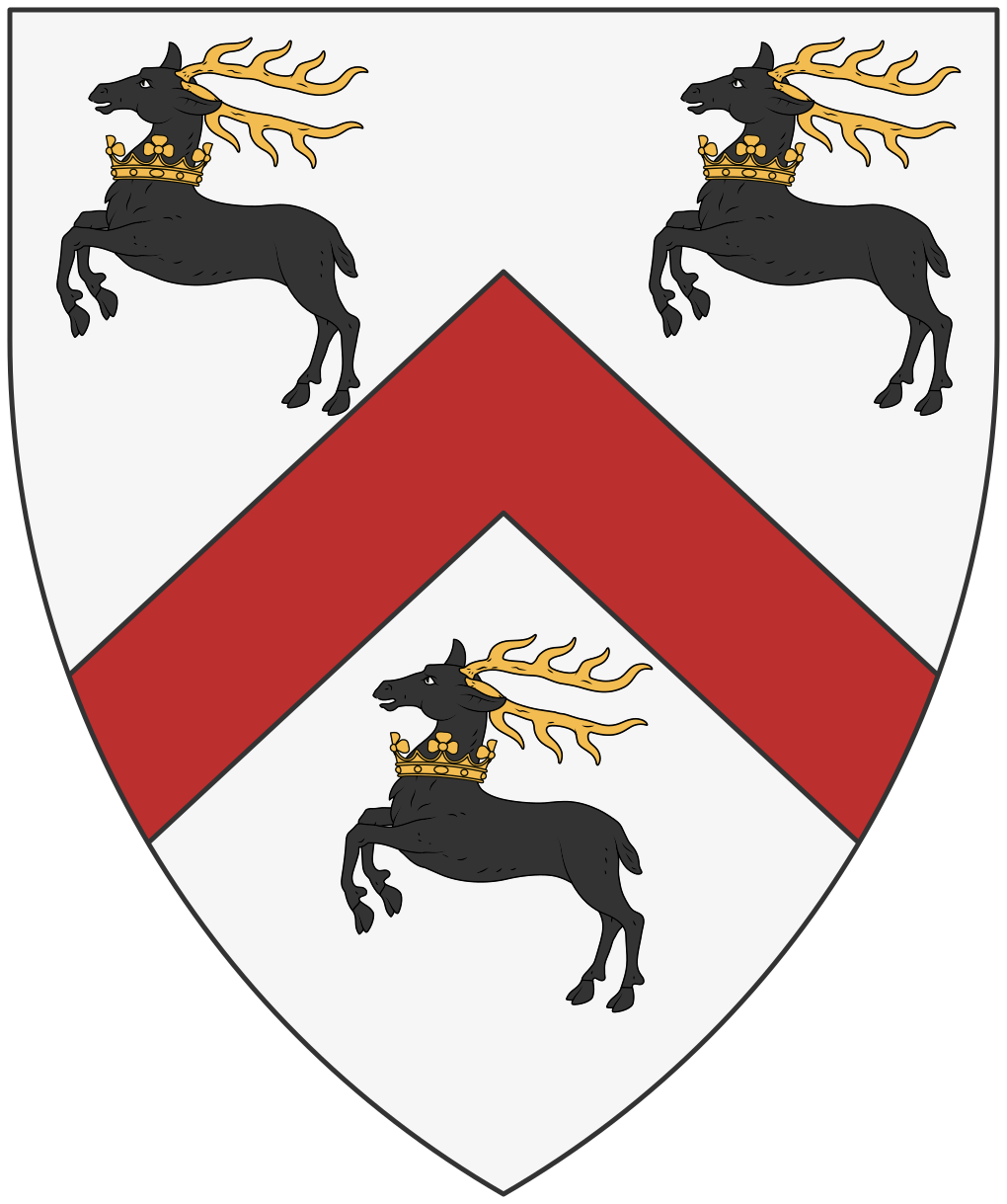
Arms of Rogers, Baron Blachford

- Frederick Rogers, 1st Baron Blachford (1811–1889)

== Rogers baronets, of Wisdome (1699; Reverted) ==
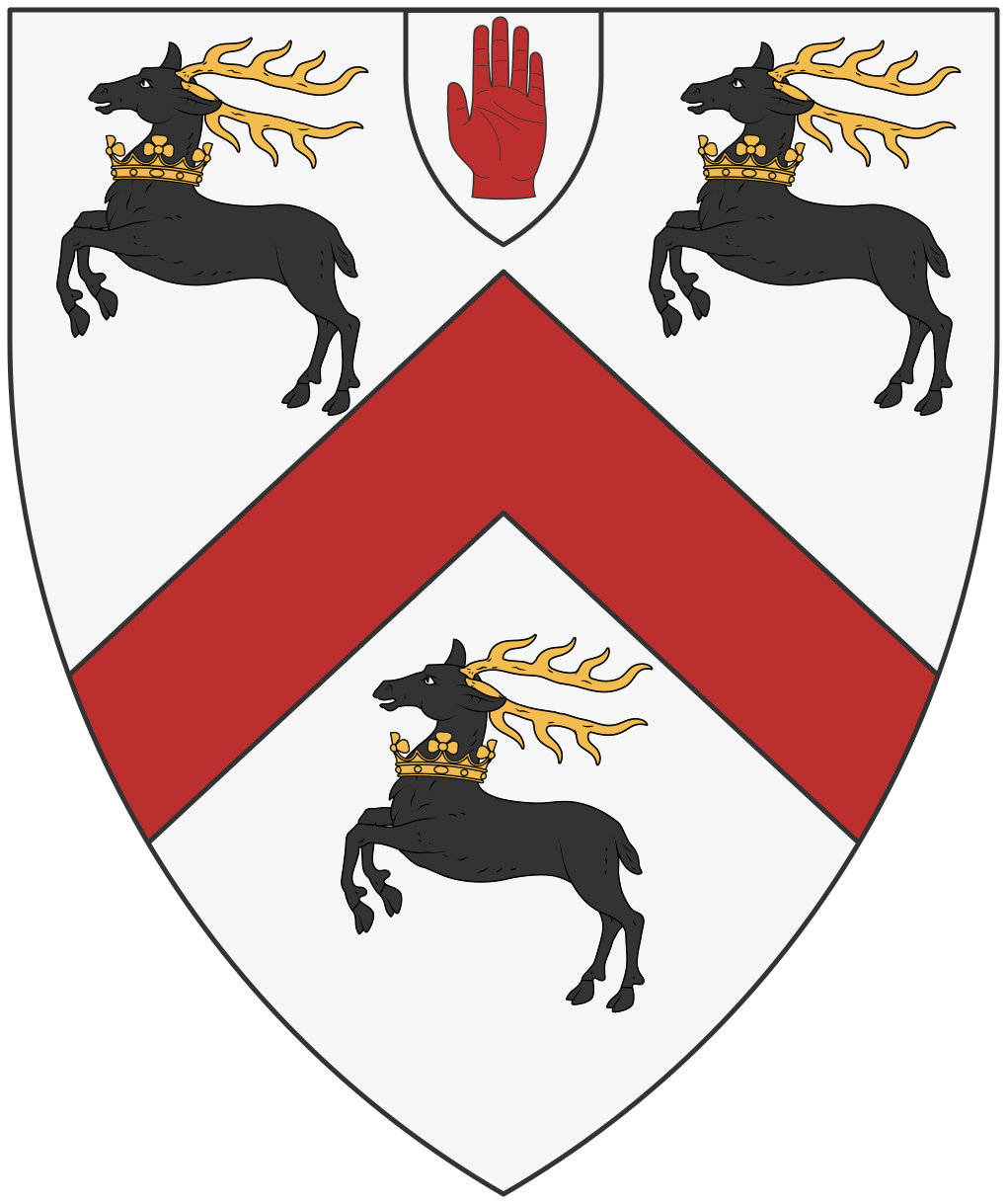
Arms of Rogers of Wisdome

- Sir John Charles Rogers, 9th Baronet (1818–1894)
- Sir Edward Rogers, 10th Baronet (1819–1895)
