= Sir John Rogers, 2nd Baronet =

English lawyer and politician

Mayor of Plymouth
- In office 1722; 1741

Member of Parliament for Plymouth
- In office 1713-1722

Personal details
- Born: 14 June 1676
- Died: 21 January 1744 (aged 67)
- Spouse: Mary Henley (m. 1698)
- Children: 10, including John
- Parent: John Rogers (father)
- Relatives: John Rogers (grandfather)

Sir John Rogers, 2nd Baronet (14 June 1676 – 21 January 1744) was an English lawyer and politician who sat in the House of Commons from 1713 to 1722.

== Biography ==
Rogers was the only son of Sir John Rogers, 1st Baronet and his wife Mary Vincent, daughter of Spencer Vincent and was baptised at St Andrew's, Plymouth on 14 June 1676. His father was a merchant of Plymouth and had also been Member of Parliament for the town from 1698 to 1700. On 9 May 1698, Rogers married Mary Henley, daughter of Sir Robert Henley at St Giles in the Fields in London after which his father gave him the Blachford Estate at Cornwood, near Ivybridge. In 1710, he succeeded his father to the baronetcy.

Rogers became Recorder of Plymouth in 1713 and was elected as Member of Parliament (MP) for Plymouth at the 1713 general election. He was re-elected MP for Plymouth at the 1715 general election but did not stand in 1722. Rogers was Mayor of Plymouth in 1722 and again in 1741.

Rogers died on 21 January 1744 aged 67 and was buried in Cornwood in Devon a week later. He and his wife had five sons and five daughters. He was succeeded in the baronetcy successively by his sons Sir John Rogers, 3rd Baronet and Frederick.

Parliament of Great Britain
Preceded by Charles Trelawny; George Byng	Member of Parliament for Plymouth; 1713–1722; With: George Byng 1713–1721; Pattee Byng 1721–1722	Succeeded by Pattee Byng; William Richard Chetwynd
Baronetage of England
Preceded by John Rogers	Baronet (of Wisdome); 1710–1744	Succeeded by John Rogers
