= Dinah Elizabeth Pearce =

British philanthropist (1836–1918)

- Baptised: 30 November 1836
- Died: 6 June 1918 (aged 81)
- Monuments: The Pearce Institute
- Known for: Philanthropy
- Spouse: William Pearce
- Children: Sir William Pearce, 2nd Baronet

Dinah Elizabeth, Lady Pearce (née Sowter; 1836–1918) was a British philanthropist, notable for building The Pearce Institute in Govan for the benefit of the local community.

== Life ==
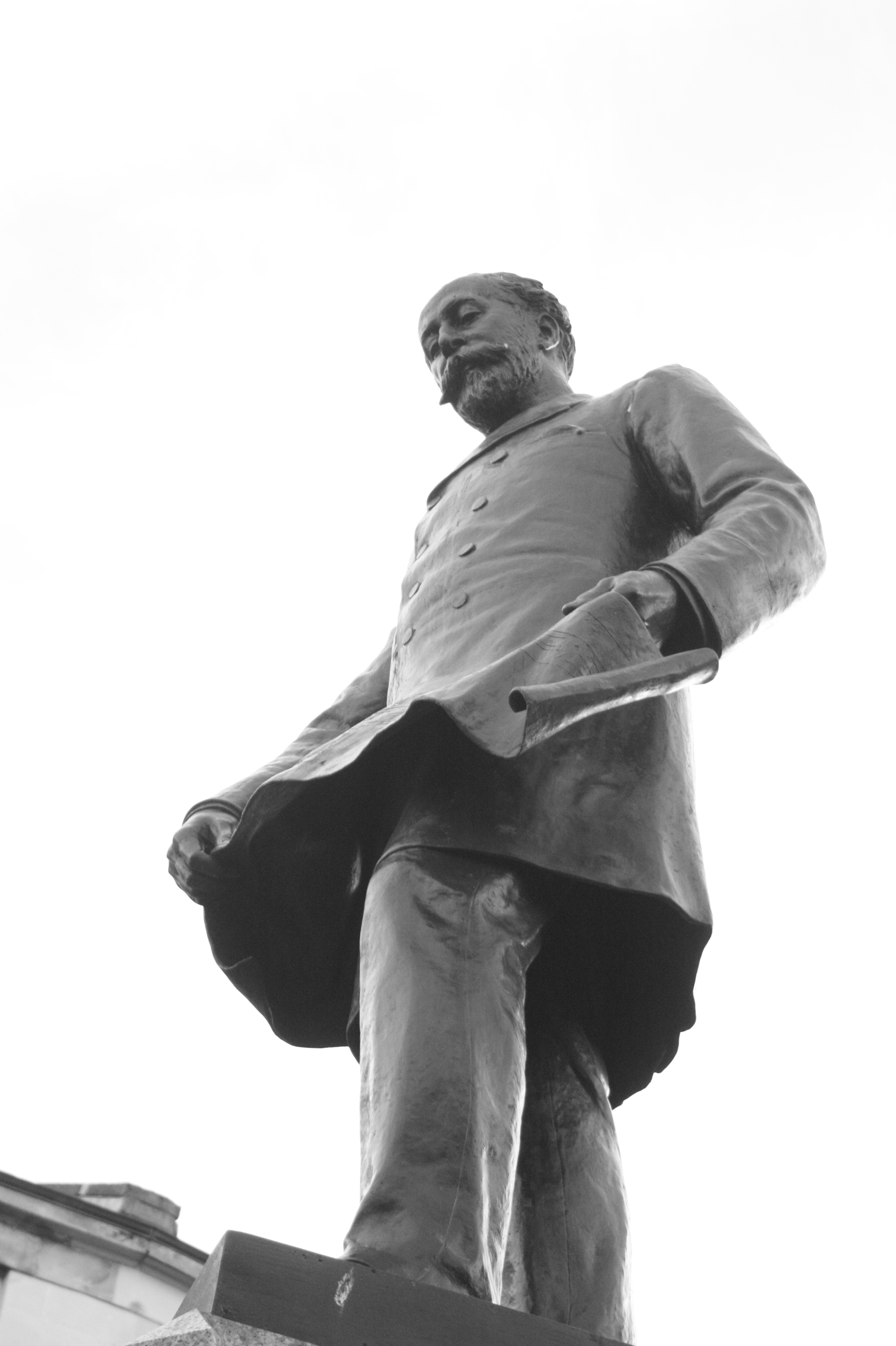
Statue of Sir William Pearce, husband of Lady Dinah Elizabeth Pearce, in Govan.

Dinah Elizabeth Sowter was born in Kent, the daughter of Robert Sowter, a victualler. In 1861 she married William Pearce, a shipbuilder and engineer. Their son, William George Pearce, was born in the same year. They set up home in Govan and occupied John Elder's villa for many years. From there they moved to Wemyss Bay further down the west coast of Scotland.

As the wife of a successful man she was required to entertain on a regular basis but she did not allow her privileged position to stop her becoming involved in the lives of ordinary Govan people. She believed until her death that working people had been let down by the government. Her husband became MP for Govan in 1885 and became a baronet two years later. Sir William was at the peak of his career and had by then become owner of Fairfield Shipyard Company which was by then a world leader. She is particularly remembered for her involvement in helping to set up the well-known project 'Fresh-Air-Fortnight' which afforded the opportunity for sick children to have a holiday usually at the seaside but also in the country in order to help their recovery. She was elected to the school board of Govan Parish in 1885 and during that time argued for female representation on school boards. It was said of Lady Pearce, "Any community was well off where there was a 'Good Angel' in the district, with a liberal heart and a readiness to help forward the best interest of the people and the district".

On William Pearce's death in 1888, Lady Pearce inherited an estate worth upwards of one million pounds.

== Philanthropy ==
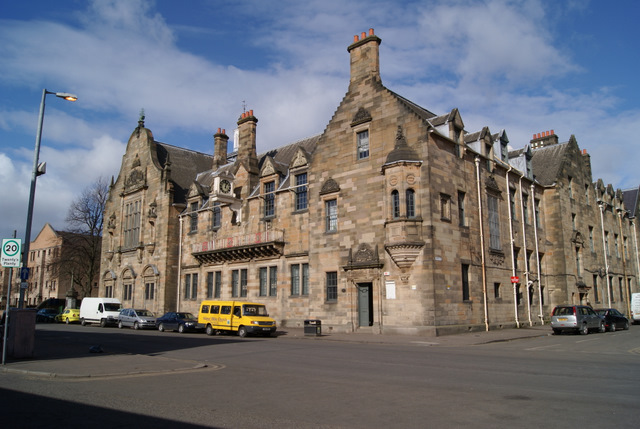
The Pearce Institute, Govan.

Lady Pearce had a strong, enduring friendship with Margaret Macgregor, and employed Margaret as the lady superintendent of the Fairfield Works Mission, whose headquarters were in Harmony Row. Lady Pearce became more deeply involved in religion through her friendship with Margaret. Like Margaret, she was non-sectarian in her approach to her philanthropy and made contributions to all the churches. After Margaret's death, Lady Pearce had a church erected in Margaret's memory, the Margaret Macgregor Memorial Church.

In 1906, Lady Pearce built the Pearce Institute as a gift to the people of Govan and in memory of her husband. The building was designed by Sir Robert Rowand Anderson. The institute's original aim was to support the welfare and wellbeing of the community, providing facilities for leisure, recreation, and education. This included a gymnasium, reading rooms, and workshops. It is an A-listed building containing a public hall, library and other rooms. She was a generous supporter of the Govan Press fund and was concerned about the wellbeing of soldiers, disabled children and anyone suffering hardship. To the end of her life she continued to have an interest in the work of the Pearce institute.

She is also known for leaving an endowment in her will to support St John's College, Durham.

== Death ==
Lady Dinah Elizabeth Pearce died at home in Wimbledon on 6 May 1918, aged 81. Her many bequests included one to the Bishop of Chelmsford, for '£150 a year to the end of the present war for the upkeep of his motorcycle.'
