= Sigismund Mendl =

British politician and businessman

Sir Sigismund Mendl KBE, MP

Member of Parliament for Plymouth
- In office 1898–1900
- Preceded by: William Pearce
- Succeeded by: Charles Harrison

Personal details
- Born: 2 December 1866 Kensington, London
- Died: 17 July 1945 (aged 78)
- Party: Liberal Party
- Profession: Politician

Sir Sigismund Ferdinand Mendl KBE (2 December 1866 – 17 July 1945) was a British Liberal Party politician and businessman.

== Early life ==
Mendl was born in Kensington, the son of Jewish Czech-born grain importer and shipowner Ferdinand and Jeanette Rachel Mendl. He was educated at Harrow School and University College, Oxford, graduating with second-class honours in Jurisprudence, and was called to the bar at the Inner Temple. Mendl was a grain importer, like his father, and served as president of the London Corn Trade Association from 1909 to 1912 and again from 1915 to 1919, and on the Royal Commission on Wheat Supplies until 1920. From 1915 to 1918, he was also a member of the War Office Advisory Committee on Army Contracts. Mendl was the first chair of Decca Records, a company that his grandson, Hugh, worked for. He was appointed Vice President of the World Services Group in 1938.

== Political career ==
Mendl was the Liberal MP for Plymouth from 1898 to 1900, having unsuccessfully contested the seat in 1895 and the Isle of Wight constituency in 1892. During his election campaign in Plymouth, the Chief Rabbi Hermann Adler urged Jewish voters in Plymouth to vote for the non-Jewish Conservative candidate over Mendl, who was Jewish. From 1915 to 1918, Mendl served on the War Office Advisory Committee on Army Contracts. Mendl was knighted in 1918.

== Personal life ==
He married Frances Moses in 1888, with whom he had two sons. His younger brother, Charles Mendl, was a diplomat. He died on 17 July 1945. His funeral was held on 20 July at Golders Green Crematorium.

Parliament of the United Kingdom
Preceded by Sir Edward Clarke and Sir William Pearce	Member of Parliament for Plymouth; 1898–1900; With: Ivor Guest and Edward Clarke	Succeeded by Charles Harrison and Sir Edward Clarke
