= Sir John Rogers, 1st Baronet =

English merchant and Member of Parliament

Member of Parliament for Plymouth
- In office 1698–1700

Personal details
- Born: c. 1649 England
- Died: 23 April 1710 (aged 60–61) Plymouth, Devon, England
- Spouse: Mary Vincent (m. 1696)
- Children: 1+, including John
- Parent: John Rogers (father)
- Relatives: Nehemiah Rogers (grandfather)

Sir John Rogers, 1st Baronet (c. 1649 – 23 April 1710) was an English merchant and Member of Parliament.

== Biography ==
He was the eldest son and only surviving child of John Rogers and his wife Elizabeth Payne, daughter of Sir Robert Payne.

He became a customs official in Plymouth and then moved to Bristol to engage in the lucrative tobacco trade, becoming a wealthy man. With his fortune he acquired several estates in the Plymouth area such as Cornwood, Ivybridge and Blachford, making Blachford over to his son John on the latter's marriage in 1698.

Rogers became a common councilman in Plymouth and was made an alderman in 1694–96. He entered the English House of Commons as member of parliament (MP) for Plymouth in 1698, representing the constituency for the next two years. He was created a baronet, of Wisdome, in the County of Devon on 21 February 1699 and was appointed High Sheriff of Devon in 1701.

Rogers died in Plymouth and was buried at Charles Church, Plymouth. He had married, in 1696, Mary Vincent, daughter of William Spencer Vincent. He was succeeded in the baronetcy by their only surviving son John.

Parliament of England
Preceded by George Parker; John Granville	Member of Parliament for Plymouth; 1698–1700; With: Charles Trelawny	Succeeded by Charles Trelawny; Henry Trelawny
Baronetage of England
New creation	Baronet (of Wisdome); 1699–1710	Succeeded by John Rogers
