= ... Legh =

16th-century English politician

... Legh (fl. 1512) was an English politician.

He was a member (MP) of the parliament of England for Plymouth in 1512.
