= Sir John Rogers, 6th Baronet =

British politician and composer

John Rogers

Member of Parliament for Callington
- In office 1812–1813 Serving with William Stephen Poyntz

Personal details
- Born: 18 April 1780 Plymouth, Devon, England
- Died: 10 December 1847 (aged 67)
- Parent: Frederick Rogers (father)
- Military career
- Branch: Army
- Rank: Captain
- Unit: Queen's Bays (2nd Dragoon Guards)

Sir John Leman Rogers, 6th Baronet (18 April 1780 – 10 December 1847) was a British politician and composer.

== Biography ==
Born in Plymouth in Devon, he was the eldest son of Sir Frederick Rogers, 5th Baronet and Jane Lillicrap, daughter of John Lillicrap. Baptised in Cornwood on 5 October 1780, Rogers was educated at Winchester College in 1795. Two years later, he succeeded his father as baronet. Rogers served in the Queen's Bays (2nd Dragoon Guards), reaching the rank of Captain. From 1812 to 1813, he sat as Member of Parliament (MP) for Callington and in 1838, he was High Sheriff of Devon.

In 1819, Rogers joined the London Madrigal Society and later, in June 1827, was elected the Society's first permanent president. He withdrew from this post in 1841 because of poor health. During his presidency he wrote some ten glees and madrigals, psalms and anthems, as well as several other musical compositions. Rogers died unmarried and was buried in Cornwood. He was succeeded in the baronetcy by his younger brother Frederick.

Parliament of the United Kingdom
Preceded by William Stephen Poyntz; Lord Binning	Member of Parliament for Callington; 1812 – 1813; With: William Stephen Poyntz	Succeeded by William Stephen Poyntz; Charles Trefusis
Baronetage of England
Preceded by Frederick Rogers	Baronet (of Wisdome); 1797–1847	Succeeded by Frederick Leman Rogers
