= Frederic Rogers, 1st Baron Blachford =

British civil servant (1811–1889)

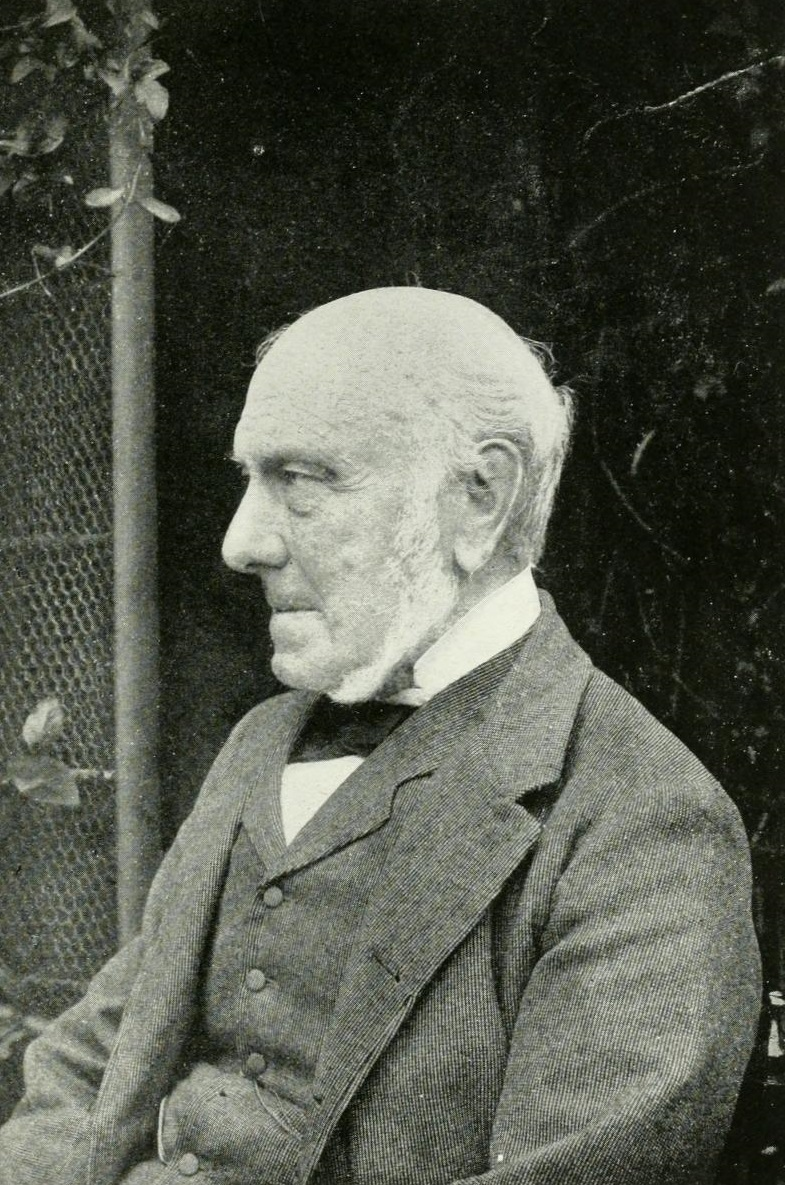

Frederic Rogers, 1st Baron Blachford GCMG PC (31 January 1811 – 21 November 1889) was a British civil servant, styled as Sir Frederick Rogers, 8th Baronet from 1851 to 1871.

== Biography ==
He was born on 31 January 1811, in London. He taught at Eton and Oriel College, Oxford, winning the Craven University scholarship, and taking a double first-class in classics and mathematics. He became a fellow of Oriel College in 1833 and won the Vinerian Scholarship (1834), and fellowship (1840). He was called to the bar in 1837, but never practised.

At school and at Oxford he was a contemporary of William Ewart Gladstone, and at Oxford, he began a lifelong friendship with J. H. Newman and R. W. Church; his classical and literary tastes, and his combination of liberalism in politics with High Church views in religion, together with his good social position and interesting character, made him an admired member of their circles.

From 1841 to 1844, he wrote for The Times, and he helped to found The Guardian in 1846; he also did a good deal to assist the Tractarian movement. But he eventually settled down to the life of a government official.

He began in 1844 as registrar of joint-stock companies, and in 1846 became commissioner of lands and emigration. Between 1857 and 1859, he was engaged in government missions abroad, connected with colonial questions, and in 1860 he was appointed permanent Under-Secretary of State for the Colonies. Sir Frederic Rogers was the guiding spirit of the Colonial Office under six successive secretaries of state. He was appointed a Knight Commander of the Order of St Michael and St George (KCMG) in the 1869 Birthday Honours and a Knight Grand Cross in the 1883 Birthday Honours.

On his retirement in 1871, he was raised to the Peerage as Baron Blachford, of Wisdome in the County of Devon, a title taken from his country home. His barony became extinct upon his death on 21 November 1889.

== See also ==
- County of Blachford

Peerage of the United Kingdom
New creation	Baron Blachford; 1871–1889	Extinct
Baronetage of England
Preceded by Frederick Leman Rogers	Baronet (of Wisdome); 1851–1889	Succeeded by John Charles Rogers
Political offices
Preceded by Herman Merivale	Permanent Under-Secretary of State for the Colonies; 1859–1871	Succeeded by Robert Herbert
