= John Rogers (Fifth Monarchist) =

English preacher and physician

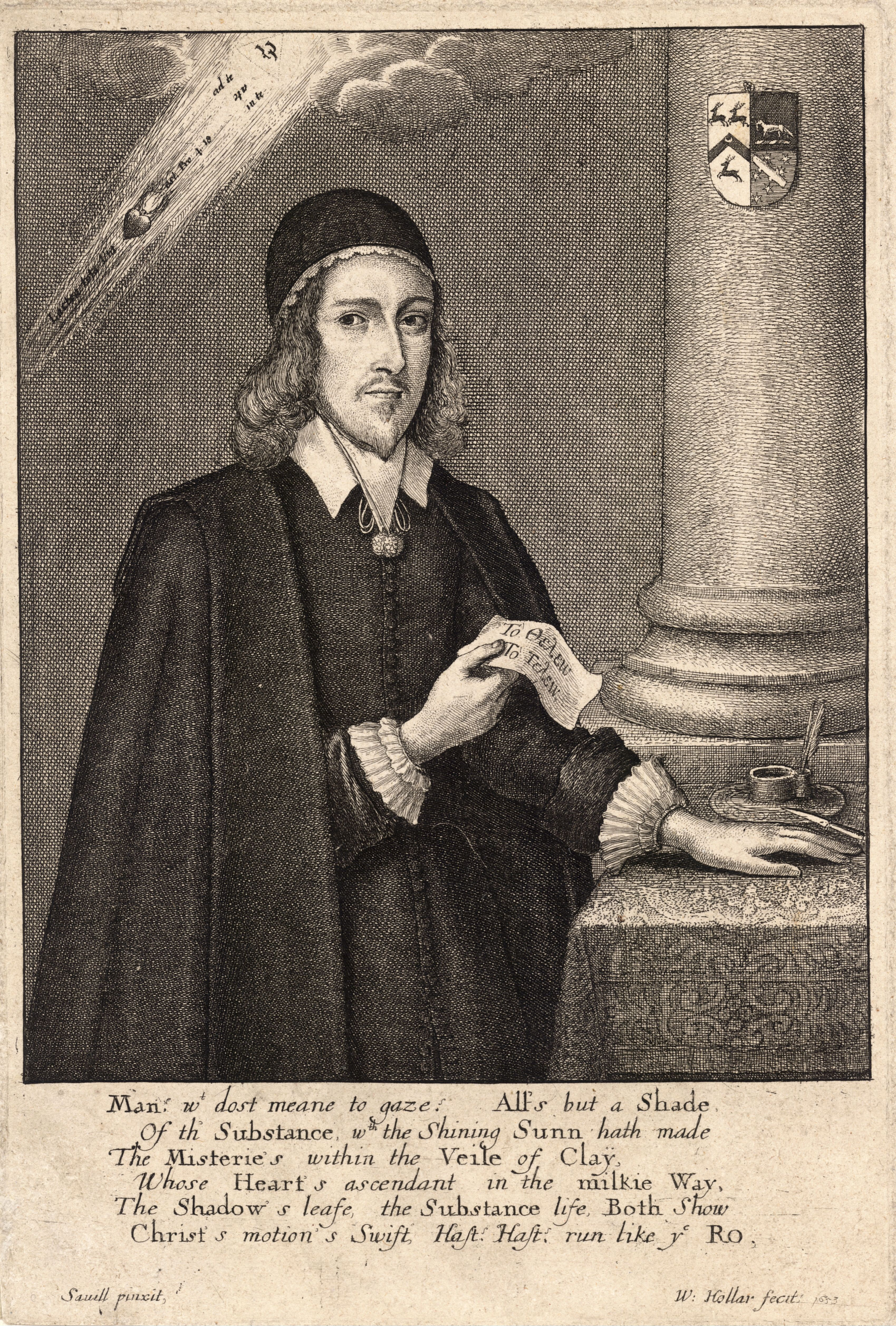
- John Rogers in an engraving by Wenceslas Hollar.
- Born: 1627; Messing, Essex, England
- Died: c. 1671 (aged 43–44)
- Education: King's College, Cambridge
- Spouse: Miss Payne
- Children: 1+, including John
- Father: Nehemiah Rogers
- Relatives: Timothy Rogers (uncle)

John Rogers (1627 – c.1671?) was an English Fifth Monarchist preacher of the 1650s, and later a physician.

== Background ==
He was born at Messing in Essex, the second son of the clergyman Nehemiah Rogers, by his wife Margaret. Because of his religious views, he was turned out by his father in 1642. He returned to studies of medicine, as a servitor at King's College, Cambridge. The First English Civil War had broken out, and the servitors were dismissed. Rogers almost starved, but in 1643 he obtained a post in a school in Lord Brudenel's house in Huntingdonshire, and afterwards at the free school at St. Neots.

== Preacher ==
In a short time he became known in Huntingdonshire as a preacher, and, returning to Essex, he received presbyterian ordination in 1647. About the same time he married a daughter of Sir Robert Payne of Midloe in Huntingdonshire, and became 'settled minister' of Purleigh in Essex, a valuable living. Rogers engaged a curate, and proceeded to London. There he renounced his presbyterian ordination, and joined the Independents. Becoming lecturer at St. Thomas Apostle, he preached violent political sermons in support of the Long parliament.

In 1650 he was sent to Dublin by parliament as a preacher. Christ Church Cathedral, Dublin was assigned him by the commissioners as a place of worship. A schism arose in his congregation owing to the adoption by a party among them of Anabaptist principles; he wearied of the controversy, and returned to England in 1652. In the following year his parishioners at Purleigh cited him for non-residence, and he lost the living.

Rogers was now no longer the champion of parliament. In 1653 Rogers published two controversial works, Bethshemesh, or Tabernacle for the Sun, in which he assailed the presbyterians, and Sagrir, or Doomes-day drawing nigh, in which he attacked the 'ungodly laws and lawyers of the Fourth Monarchy,' and also the collection of tithes. The two books indicate the date of his change of views: Bethshemesh is written from the standard Independent standpoint, while in Sagrir he has developed the characteristics of a fifth-monarchy man. The forcible dissolution of the Long parliament met with Rogers's approval. Besides doctrinal differences, he had personal quarrels with prominent members: Sir John Maynard had appeared against him as advocate for the congregation at Purleigh, while Zachary Crofton had anonymously attacked his preaching in a pamphlet.

== Imprisonment ==
After Cromwell's coup d'état Rogers occupied himself with two long addresses to him, in which he recommended a system of government very similar to that which was actually inaugurated. This accord did not survive the dissolution of Cromwell's first parliament and his assumption of the title of Lord Protector. Rogers addressed a cautionary epistle to Cromwell, and assailed him openly from the pulpit. Being denounced as a conspirator in 1654, his house was searched and his papers seized. This drew from him another denunciation. On 28 March he proclaimed a solemn day of humiliation for the sins of the rulers. His sermon, in which he likened Whitehall to Sodom and demonstrated that Cromwell had broken the first eight commandments (time preventing his proceeding to the last two), procured his arrest and imprisonment in Lambeth. On 5 February 1655 he was brought from prison to appear before Cromwell. He held by his previous utterances, and desired Cromwell to remember that he must be judged. On 30 March he was moved to Windsor, and on 9 October to the Isle of Wight. He was released in January 1657, and immediately returned to London.

The fifth-monarchy men were then deep in conspiracy. Informations were repeatedly laid against Rogers, and on 3 February 1658 he was sent to the Tower of London on the Protector's warrant. This imprisonment lasted only till 16 April. Four and a half months later Cromwell died. The fifth-monarchy men followed Sir Henry Vane in opposing Richard Cromwell's succession, and Rogers denounced him vehemently from the pulpit. The remnant of the Long parliament was recalled to power, and Rogers involved himself in controversy with William Prynne. Both supported "the good old cause," but differed in defining it. Prynne remained true to the older ideal of limited monarchy, while Rogers advocated a republic with Christ himself as its invisible sovereign.

== Later life ==
His faction now wanted him to proceed safely to Ireland to preach the gospel. The insurrection of Sir George Booth intervened, and brought him the post of chaplain in Charles Fairfax's regiment. He served through the campaign against Booth, and at its conclusion was relieved of his duties in Ireland. In October he was nominated to a lectureship at Shrewsbury, but he was again in Dublin by the end of the year, and was imprisoned there for a time by the orders of the army leaders, after they had dissolved the remnant of the Long parliament. Parliament ordered his release immediately on regaining its ascendancy.

At the time of the Restoration he moved to the Netherlands. He resumed the study of medicine, at Leyden and Utrecht, and received a Utrecht M.D. In 1662 he returned to England and resided at Bermondsey. In 1664 he was admitted to an ad eundem degree of M.D. at Oxford. His date of death is not known. His oldest son and only surviving child was Sir John Rogers, 1st Baronet.
