= Houldsworth baronets of Reddish and Coodham (1887) =

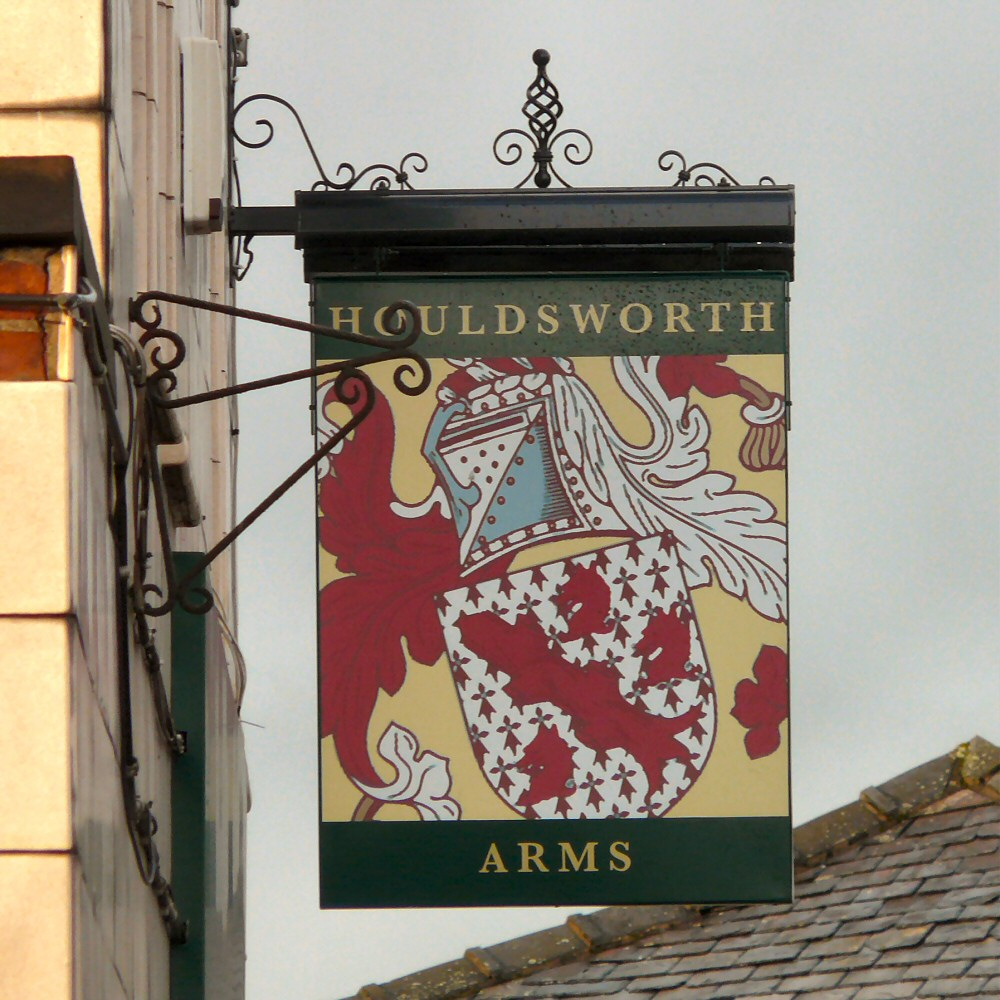
Houldsworth arms pub sign, for the blazon ermine, the trunk of a tree eradicated at the base raguly proper, between three foxes' heads erased gules

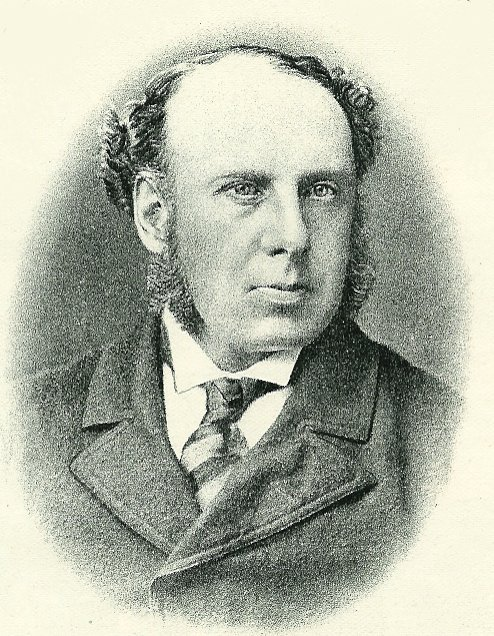
Sir William Houldsworth, 1st Baronet

The Houldsworth baronetcy, of Reddish, in the Parish of Manchester, in the County Palatine of Lancaster and of Coodham, in the Parish of Symington, in the County of Ayr, was created in the Baronetage of the United Kingdom on 20 July 1887 for the mill-owner and politician William Houldsworth. He was Member of Parliament for Manchester from 1883 to 1885 and for Manchester North from 1885 to 1906. The family surname is pronounced "Hoaldsworth".

== Houldsworth baronets, of Reddish and Coodham (1887) ==
- Sir William Henry Houldsworth, 1st Baronet (1834–1917)
- Sir Henry Hamilton Houldsworth, 2nd Baronet (1867–1947)
- Sir William Thomas Reginald Houldsworth, 3rd Baronet (1874–1960)
- Sir Reginald Douglas Henry Houldsworth, 4th Baronet (1903–1989)
- Sir Richard Thomas Reginald Houldsworth, 5th Baronet (1947–2023)
- Sir Simon Richard Henry Houldsworth, 6th Baronet (born 1971).

The heir presumptive to the title is Nicolas Peter George Houldsworth (born 1975), younger brother of the 6th Baronet.

Succession

- Sir William Henry Houldsworth, 1st Baronet (1834–1917)
  - Sir Henry Hamilton Houldsworth, 2nd Baronet (1867–1947)
  - Walter Crum Houldsworth (1870–1880)
  - Sir William Thomas Reginald Houldsworth, 3rd Baronet (1874–1960)
    - Sir Reginald Douglas Henry Houldsworth, 4th Baronet (1903–1989)
      - Sir Richard Thomas Reginald Houldsworth, 5th Baronet (1947–2023)
        - Sir Simon Richard Henry Houldsworth, 6th Baronet (born 1971)
        - (1) Nicolas Peter George Houldsworth (born 1975)
          - (2) Edward George Houldsworth (born 2012)
        - (3) Matthew James Houldsworth (born 1992)
    - Walter William Whitmore Houldsworth (1906–2002)
      - (4) Charles William Shepherd Houldsworth (born 1946)

== Notes ==
Baronetage of the United Kingdom
Preceded by Dalrymple baronets	Houldsworth baronets of Reddish and Coodham; 20 July 1887	Succeeded by Pearce baronets
