= John Waddon (Parliamentarian) =

English politician

John Waddon (born January 1591) was an English politician who sat in the House of Commons of England from 1640 to Pride's Purge in 1648. He was a Presbyterian, and supported the Parliamentarian side in the English Civil War.

== Life ==
Waddon was the son of John Waddon of Plymouth and his wife Alice. He was at Exeter College, Oxford and was awarded BA in 1609 and MA in 1612. In 1631 he was Mayor of Plymouth.

In April 1640, Waddon was elected Member of Parliament for Plymouth for the Short Parliament. He was re-elected in November 1640 for the Long Parliament and sat until 1648 when he was excluded under Pride's Purge.

Waddon married Prudence Fownes daughter of Thomas Fownes of Plymouth in 1613.

Parliament of England
Vacant Parliament suspended since 1629	Member of Parliament for Plymouth; 1640–1648; With: Robert Trelawney 1640–1642; Sir John Yonge, 1st Baronet 1642–1648	Not represented in Rump Parliament
