= Dalrymple baronets of New Hailes (1887) =

The Dalrymple baronetcy of New Hailes was created on 19 July 1887, in the Baronetage of the United Kingdom for the politician Charles Dalrymple (previously Fergusson). A Conservative Junior Lord of the Treasury (i.e. party whip) in 1885, he was Member of Parliament for Buteshire from 1868 to 1885, and for Ipswich from 1886 to 1906.

The 1st Baronet was the second son of Sir Charles Dalrymple Fergusson, 5th Baronet; and grandson of Sir James Fergusson, 4th Baronet and his wife Jean Dalrymple, who was the daughter of Sir David Dalrymple, 3rd Baronet of the 1701 creation.

This title became extinct on the death of the 3rd Baronet on 29 June 1971.

== Dalrymple baronets, of New Hailes (1887) ==
- Sir Charles Dalrymple, 1st Baronet (1839–1916).
- Sir David Charles Herbert Dalrymple, 2nd Baronet (1879–1932).
- Sir Charles Mark Dalrymple, 3rd Baronet (1915–1971), died leaving no heir.

== Notes ==
Baronetage of the United Kingdom
Preceded by Evans baronets	Dalrymple baronets of New Hailes; 19 July 1887	Succeeded by Houldsworth baronets
