= Pearce baronets =

Extinct baronetcy in the Baronetage of the United Kingdom

- Escutcheon of the Pearce baronets of Cardell
- Creation date: 1887
- Status: extinct
- Extinction date: 1907
- Seats: Cardell House, Wemyss Bay
- Motto: Audax et celer, Bold and swift

The Pearce baronetcy, of Cardell House in the County of Renfrew, was a title in the Baronetage of the United Kingdom. It was created on 21 July 1887 for the shipbuilder William Pearce. He was Member of Parliament for Govan from 1885 until his death in 1888.

His only son the 2nd Baronet was also a businessman, and Member of Parliament for Plymouth from 1892 to 1895. He was childless and the title became extinct on his death in 1907.

== Pearce baronets, of Cardell (1887) ==
- Sir William Pearce, 1st Baronet (1833–1888)
- Sir William George Pearce, 2nd Baronet (1861–1907)

Baronetage of the United Kingdom
Preceded by Houldsworth baronets	Pearce baronets of Cardell; 21 July 1887	Succeeded by Moon baronets
