= Margaret Macgregor =

Scottish Christian missionary (1838–1901)

- Born: Margaret Ann Kinniburgh Burns; 11 November 1838; Edinburgh
- Died: 20 January 1901 (aged 62)
- Education: Moray House School, Edinburgh
- Occupation: Christian Missionary

Margaret Ann Kinniburgh Macgregor (née Burns; 11 November 1838 – 20 January 1901) was an urban Christian missionary whose work was in service to the people of Govan, Glasgow.

== Life ==
Margaret was born in Edinburgh on 11 November 1838, and died on 20 January 1901 in Glasgow. She was the daughter of Jeanie Marshall and James Burns and later married Thomas Macgregor. Margaret attended Moray House School in Edinburgh and was a congregant of Lothian Road United Presbyterian Church in Edinburgh, but experienced an evangelical conversion during the evangelical revival in Scotland (1859–1861), after which she joined St Mary's Free Church in Govan.

== Religious work ==
Margaret was involved with St Mary's Free Church's Sabbath school and did extensive community outreach work including visiting the sick, hosting meetings for local mothers in her home, and running evangelical and Bible meetings. When her range of activities became too big for St Mary's Free Church premises to handle, she moved to a new place in Harmony Row, funded by local philanthropist Isabella Elder.

As Lady Superintendent of the Fairfield Works Mission, she was responsible for a number of initiatives including helping women gain sewing and domestic work skills, Bible instruction, and a welcoming space for prayer, including childcare for working women and widowers. Known as Govan's 'Bible wumman', Margaret's approach to the Mission was non-denominational and in cooperation with local Protestant groups.

== The Macgregor Memorial Church ==
After her death, philanthropist Lady Dinah Pearce funded the construction of the Macgregor Memorial Church (built between 1902 and 1904) in her honour. Designed by James Miller (who also designed buildings for the Glasgow International Exhibition in 1901), the church sat at the corner of Craigton Road and Crosslan Road in Govan, Glasgow until it was demolished in 1994 to make way for a car park. The congregation was merged with Govan Old Church.
