= William Hawkins (died 1589) =

English sea-captain

- Born: Plymouth, Devon, England
- Died: 7 October 1589
- Burial place: Church of St Nicholas, Deptford
- Occupations: Merchant; Sea captain
- Spouse(s): Unknown (m.); Mary Halse (m.)
- Children: William Hawkins

William Hawkins or Hawkyns (died 7 October 1589) was an English sea-captain, merchant, and slaver.

== Life ==
William Hawkins was son of William Hawkins (died 1553), and elder brother of Sir John Hawkins (1532–1595). In 1553–34, he was admitted to the freedom of Plymouth. He took a prominent part in local affairs, and was three times mayor: in 1567–68, in 1578–79, and again in 1587–88. It was during his first mayoralty that the earliest bylaws for the regulation of the shipping in Sutton Pool were issued.

In the following year, 1568–69, he built, it is said, the new conduit associated with the Market Cross in the Old Town. It is, however, as a shipowner that his name enters more prominently into history. From the beginning of the disturbances in the Low Countries his vessels cruised in the Channel; nominally privateers, they bore a close resemblance to pirates. In 1568, he held the commission of the Prince de Condé to act against the ships of the League. In December 1568, he was associated with Sir Arthur Champernowne in seizing the Spanish treasure at Plymouth.

On 20 January 1568–69, he sent to Cecil the news of the disastrous defeat of his brother John at San Juan de Lua, and requested that a share of the Spanish goods detained in Plymouth might be allotted to him in compensation. On 27 January 1568–69, he sent word to Cecil of his brother's return home. Complaints innumerable of the depredations committed by his cruisers were made by the King of France and the Spanish ambassador. These ships were apparently owned jointly with his brother John; it is impossible to distinguish between the two, the more so as neither of them seems to have taken any personal part in the acts complained of; but the name of Hawkyns, in its French form Haquin, or in Spanish Achines, became a sound of terror in the narrow seas.

In 1582, he commanded an expedition to the West Indies, of which, however, nothing is known beyond the mention of it by his nephew, Sir Richard Hawkins. During his third mayoralty he helped to fit out from Plymouth seven ships against the Armada, was active in collecting reinforcements for the fleet, and in April 1589 contributed 25l. to the loan raised to defray the expenses of defence. He died on 7 October 1589, and was buried in the church of St. Nicholas, Deptford, where a monument to his memory was erected by his brother, but no trace of it now remains. His will was proved in London on 20 October 1589.

By a first wife, Hawkyns was father of William Hawkins or Hawkyns (fl. 1595) and of three daughters. His second wife was Mary, daughter of John Halse, by whom he had four sons and three daughters. His widow afterward married Sir Warwick Hele.

== Sources ==
- Notes supplied by Miss Mary W. S. Hawkins;
- Calendar of State Papers (1568–89);
- James Anthony Froude's History of England;
- Transactions of the Devonshire Association, 1883;
- Miss Hawkins's Plymouth Armada Heroes.

== Bibliography ==
- Stephen, Leslie; Lee, Sidney, eds. (1891). "Hawkins, William (d.1589)" . Dictionary of National Biography. Vol. 25. London: Smith, Elder & Co. p. 228.
