= Robert Trelawney =

Robert Trelawney (25 March 1598 – 1643) was an English merchant and colonist who settled lands in what became Maine, United States. He was also a politician who sat in the House of Commons of England from 1640 to 1642.

The son of Robert Trelawney, thrice mayor of Plymouth, Trelawney was a merchant and colonist at the settlement. On 1 December 1631, the Plymouth Company granted he and his partner, Moses Goodyeare, a patent for a tract of land between Spurwink River and Presumpscot River, and for Richmond's Island at Cape Elizabeth, Maine, on which they created the Trelawney Plantation. In 1633, Trelawney was elected mayor of Plymouth. He built Ham House, near Plymouth, in 1639.

In April 1640, Trelawney was elected Member of Parliament for Plymouth for the Short Parliament. He was re-elected in November 1640 for the Long Parliament, but was expelled from the House of Commons in March 1642 and committed to prison for publicly stating that the Commons had no power to appoint a guard for themselves without the King's consent.

Trelawney married Elizabeth Mayne, daughter of Alexander Mayne, in 1620. He was the father of Samuel Trelawney, who was also MP for Plymouth.

Parliament of England
Vacant Parliament suspended since 1629	Member of Parliament for Plymouth; 1640–1642; With: John Waddon	Succeeded by John Waddon; Sir John Yonge, 1st Baronet
