= Sir Frederick Rogers, 5th Baronet =

British politician

Frederick Rogers

Member of Parliament for Plymouth
- In office 1780-1784; 1790-1797 Serving with Vice Admiral George Darby; Captain Alan Gardner; William Elford

Mayor of Plymouth
- In office 1774-1775

Personal details
- Born: 23 July 1746
- Died: 21 June 1797 (aged 50) Speenhamland, Berkshire, England
- Spouse: Jane Lillicrap (m. 1770)
- Children: 2+, including John

Sir Frederick Leman Rogers, 5th Baronet (23 July 1746 – 21 June 1797) was a British politician who sat in the House of Commons between 1780 and 1797.

== Early life ==
Rogers was the eldest son of Sir Frederick Rogers, 4th Baronet, of Blachford and his first wife Grace Cooper, daughter of Nathaniel Cooper-Leman of Norwich and Plymouth, clerk to the Victualling Board, and was born on 23 July 1746. His father was commissioner of the dockyard.

Rogers married Jane Lillicrap, daughter of John Lillicrap, a warrant officer at Gibraltar, at Gretna Green on 21 December 1769. They were also married formally at Plymouth St. Maurice, Devon on 27 June 1770. Rogers was Mayor of Plymouth for 1774–5. He succeeded his father in the baronetcy on 7 June 1777. He also became Gentleman of the Privy Chamber and recorder of Plymouth in 1777.

== Political career ==
Rogers's family had represented Plymouth for many years and his father had been politically active in the Government interest at Plymouth. In April 1780 Rogers started to campaign for a seat at Plymouth with Admiral Sir Charles Hardy one of the sitting Members. When Handy died, Rogers stood for Plymouth as administration candidate at the by-election and in a contest was returned as Member of Parliament on 31 May 1780. He was re-elected after a contest at the 1780 general election. He did not stand again for Parliament at the 1784 general election.

Early in 1790 there was another vacancy at Plymouth. but Rogers decided not to stand out of respect for the administration. Having explained this to the Duke of Leeds who was Foreign secretary, he was given government support at the 1790 general election. He won a seat narrowly in the contest, and survived a petition. At the 1796 general election he was personally recommended by Pitt and was returned unopposed

== Later years and legacy ==
Rogers died at Speenhamland, Berkshire on 21 June 1797 and was buried at Cornwood. He was succeeded in the baronetcy by his eldest son John as the 6th Baronet, followed by his second son Frederick as the 7th Baronet.

Parliament of Great Britain
| Preceded by Viscount Lewisham; Admiral Sir Charles Hardy | Member of Parliament for Plymouth; 1780–1784; With: Vice Admiral George Darby | Succeeded by Captain John Macbride; Captain Robert Fanshawe |
| Preceded by Captain John Macbride; Captain Alan Gardner | Member of Parliament for Plymouth; 1790–1797; With: Captain Alan Gardner; William Elford | Succeeded by Francis Glanville; William Elford |
Baronetage of England
| Preceded by Frederick Rogers | Baronet (of Wisdome); 1777-1797 | Succeeded by John Leman Rogers |
