= James Horsewell =

16th-century English politician

James Horsewell or Horswell (by 1496 – 1544/46) was Mayor and MP of Plymouth, England.

He was a municipal official with posts in the admiralty court and the customs of Plymouth and served as Mayor of the town in 1528–29, 1535–36 and 1542–43.

He was elected MP for Plymouth in 1539 and 1542.
