= 1900 Plymouth by-election =

UK Parliamentary by-election

The 1900 Plymouth by-election was held on 16 February 1900. The by-election came after the resignation of the incumbent Conservative MP, Sir Edward Clarke. It was won unopposed by the Conservative candidate Hon. Ivor Churchill Guest.

== Background ==
Clarke, a prominent barrister and Solicitor-General in the Conservative government of 1886–1892, had held the seat since 1880. Following the outbreak of war in South Africa in late 1899, Clarke had found himself in total disagreement with his party over the government's South African policy. In early February 1900 his constituency party at Plymouth formally called upon him to resign his seat, and he resigned the following day.

== Candidates ==
=== Unionist ===
The executive of the Conservative Association suggested Hon. Ivor Guest as the Unionist candidate on 10 February, and this was confirmed by the local association two days later. No other potential candidates were mentioned.

Guest was a lieutenant in the Dorset Yeomanry, and had volunteered for service during the Second Boer War. He visited the constituency during the campaign, arriving directly from Dorchester barracks where he had been in training, and left for South Africa shortly after the election.

=== Liberal ===
The Plymouth Liberals did not choose a candidate, but referred the matter to the general council of the party. One source states that many liberals were opposed to a contest, and a majority of the council decided not to contest the election. Hon. Thomas A. Brassey had previously been mentioned as a possible candidate.

== Issues ==
The ongoing Second Boer War became the important issue, as Clarke resigned following disagreement with his own party over their policy. The local Conservative association chose an officer bound for South Africa as their candidate, and when he visited the constituency, Guest duly declared himself a strong supporter of the government.

== Result ==
The Hon. Ivor Churchill Guest won the election unopposed at the nomination meeting on 16 February 1900.
