= William Hawkins (fl. c. 1600) =

English sea captain and merchant (b. c.1560)

- In office ?–1613
- Monarch: James VI and I
- In office 1609–1611
- Monarch: Jahangir

Personal details
- Died: 1613 Ireland
- Spouse: Mariam Khan
- Parent: William Hawkins
- Occupation: Merchant; Sea captain Mansabdar

Military service
- Allegiance: Kingdom of England; East India Company; Mughal Empire

Sir William Hawkins (fl. c. 1600) was a representative of the English East India Company, notable for being the commander of Hector, the first company ship to anchor at Surat in India on 24 August 1608.

Hawkins travelled to Agra and met the Mughal Emperor Jahangir in 1609.

== Early life ==
William Hawkins was the eldest son of an English sea-captain, merchant, and slaver also named William Hawkins (died 1589), and a nephew of Admiral John Hawkins (1532–1595).

In 1577, he took part in Francis Drake's voyage to the South Sea, presumably aboard the Elizabeth with John Wynter, though possibly aboard the Golden Hind with Drake himself.

In October 1581, he was nominated, apparently at the request of his uncle, as lieutenant to Edward Fenton.

In May 1582, Hawkins was further appointed to command an expedition to the East Indies and China that sailed from England. However, Hawkins came to be on bad terms with Fenton and John Hawkins due to jealousy over the claims that had been put forward on his behalf to command the expedition; partly also, it may be, because of Hawkins's own insolent and insubordinate conduct. The enmity intensified due to the official instruction to Fenton not to replace Hawkins. When the little fleet sailed from Plymouth, Hawkins was still onshore, and Fenton put to sea without him; he was brought out in the Francis, one of the squadron's ships, and put aboard his ship, the Leicester. Throughout the voyage, the captain and the lieutenant seem to have quarrelled on every occasion until they arrived at the River Thames.

In 1587, Hawkins may be identified with the William Hawkyns who commanded the Advice on the coast of Ireland.

In 1588, Hawkins once again commanded a ship named the Griffin in a battle against the Spanish Armada. It has been suggested that the commander of the Griffin was his father, then mayor of Plymouth; however, this was seemingly contradicted by the fact that on 19 July the Griffin was at sea with Sir Francis Drake, while the mayor of Plymouth was onshore collecting reinforcements. However, Hawkins was not an uncommon Devonshire name, and it is possible that the commander of the Advice or Griffin belonged to another family.

In 1589, by his father's will, Hawkins inherited a contract annuity of £40.

In 1595, his uncle John Hawkins also granted Hawkins an inheritance consisting of a share of the prospective profits of the last fatal voyage to the West Indies and an annuity of £10 a year, to be paid quarterly, on condition that he did not sell the annuity, the rent-charge, or any part thereof. He also left legacies of £100 to each of Hawkyns's children, to be payable "to every such child at the time of their marriage, or at the accomplishment of their several ages of eighteen years, which shall first happen." From the wording of this clause, it would seem likely that the children were girls, but nothing more is known about them.

== Activities in India ==
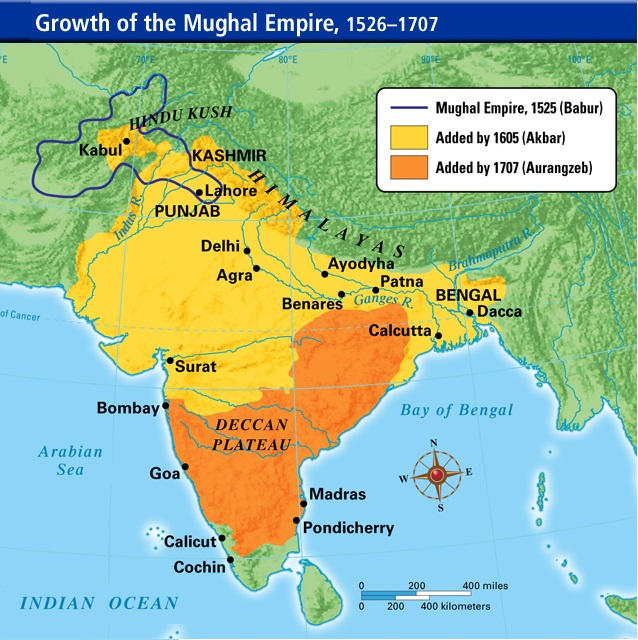
The Mughal Empire during Hawkins's time, showing key cities Agra and Surat

On 1 April 1607, Hawkins left for India with his wife, David Middleton, and William Keeling. He took command of the East India Company's ship Hector on a voyage to Surat with William Keeling and was entrusted with the king of England's letters and gifts for the princes and governors of Cambay due to his experience in the region and his language skills.

On 24 August 1608, Hawkins arrived at Surat and was approached by Portuguese sailors, who told him that all the ports in the region belonged to Philip III of Spain. As a result of the efforts of the viceroy of Deccan sultanates, Khan-Khana, the ship was authorised to set sail, and Hawkins was allowed to proceed to Agra.

Hawkins then proceeded to Agra and the Mughal court to negotiate permission for the English company to establish a factory under the authority of the Mughal emperor Jahangir, where he remained for nearly three years. According to the account given in his journal, the emperor gained a favorable impression of Hawkins and assigned him an administrative position with an annual payment estimated at more than £3,000. His principal occupation was combating Portuguese intrigues and endeavoring to obtain formal permission for the establishment of an English factory at Surat. During his time in Agra, Hawkins opposed Portuguese political intrigues at the Mughal court while also seeking imperial authorisation for his company to establish a factory in Surat for trade with India.

Hawkins's proficiency in the Turkish language was a crucial factor in navigating the Mughal court and gaining access to the emperor himself. His favour with the emperor enabled him to overcome difficulties at court, and the required licence was granted; it was the first distinct recognition of English commerce in the East. Jahangir also warned the Portuguese Jesuits not to attempt to harm Hawkins, for example by poisoning his food. The emperor granted authorisation for Hawkins but made it a condition that he marry a local Indian woman. Hawkins consented to the match on condition that she was not a Moor and accordingly took as his wife the daughter of an Armenian Christian. Hawkins's wife was Mariam Khan, the daughter of an influential merchant at the courts of the Mughal Emperors Akbar and Jahangir.

Furthermore, Hawkins was appointed by the emperor as a Mansabdar (a military official in the Mughal Empire), with command of 400 horses and a rent worth 30,000 rupees, while also being granted the status of the East India Company's official ambassador at court. During this time, he also recorded details of the Mansabdar administration. During his stay, he recorded the names of about 41 Mansabdar officers who commanded between 3,000 and 5,000 zat, or horsemen.

In 1610, Hawkins instructed one of his fellow merchants, William Finch, to travel about 80 km south-west from Agra to Bayana, a town well known for its high-quality indigo production. At this time, one of the ships owned by Mariam-uz-Zamani, who held the status of empress dowager of the Mughal Empire, was being prepared for a voyage to Mokha. The empress dowager's enterprise was tasked with procuring Indigofera, presumably an important part of the royal cargo. However, just as the deal was being concluded, William Finch increased the bid, which angered Mariam uz Zamani. Hawkins, already in trouble with Jahangir for other reasons, suffered the consequences. It was also thought that Hawkins's political rival at the Mughal court, Abdul Hassan, reported Hawkins's drinking habits to Jahangir, who strongly forbade wine at his court. In the end, Mariam-uz-Zamani pressured her son, Emperor Jahangir, to ensure that Hawkins, who was still on good terms with him at the time, leave India.

Although Hawkins failed to convince Jahangir to oust the Portuguese representatives from the Mughal court, he managed to secure permission to establish factories in Surat and Gujarat. This was cemented by the English victory over the Portuguese at the Battle of Swally in 1612, which impressed Jahangir.

== After Indian activities ==
In November 1611, Hawkins left Agra and, three months later, arrived at Surat, where he found Sir Henry Middleton, with whom he went to the Red Sea and afterward to Java. At the end of his time in India, Hawkins failed to secure permission from the Mughal emperor to build an English factory. (Note: The mission to secure emperor's authorization instead accomplished by Captain Middleton in the same year.)

In 1612, Hawkins visited the Arabian Peninsula and reached Java.

In 1613, Hawkins left Bantam on his ship Thomas, part of the fleet under the overall command of John Saris, on a voyage to England.

The ship finally touched at the Cape of Good Hope. Hawkins died in his ship during this journey at the end of the year. He was buried in Ireland.

In 1614, the inheritance for the widow of William Hawkins was charged to the accounts of the ship Thomas. However, there was nothing left for any of his daughters from a former marriage.

A year after Hawkins's death, Mariam married Captain Gabriel Towerson and returned with him to India. Towerson abandoned her and returned to England in 1619 before resettling in Amboyna. Despite appealing to the East India Company for maintenance, she received nothing, and upon Towerson's death his assets were awarded to his brother.

== Appendix ==
=== Bibliography ===
- "Hawkins, William (fl.1595)". Dictionary of National Biography. 2016.
- "Arrival of William Hawkins in court of Jahangir". General Knowledge. 2011.
- Columbia University (2016). Third Voyage EIC.
- Columbia University (2016). Narrative by William Hawkins, of Occurrences during his Residence in the Dominions of the Great Mogul.
- Melo, João Vicente (2022). Jesuit and English Experiences at the Mughal Court, c. 1580–1615. New Transculturalisms, 1400–1800. Springer Nature. pp. 156–158. ISBN 978-3030965884.
- Riddick, John F. (2006). The History of British India: A Chronology. India: Faber. ISBN 978-0313322808.
- Fisher, Michael; Dalrymple, William (2007). Visions of Mughal India: An Anthology of European Travel Writing. United Kingdom: I.B. Tauris. ISBN 978-1845113544.
- Flores, Jorge (2015). The Mughal Padshah: A Jesuit Treatise on Emperor Jahangir's Court and Household. Volume 6 of Rulers & Elites. Brill. p. 74. ISBN 978-9004307537.

This article incorporates text from a publication now in the public domain: "Hawkins, William (fl.1595)". Dictionary of National Biography. London: Smith, Elder & Co. 1885–1900.
