= 1871 Plymouth by-election =

UK Parliamentary by-election

The 1871 Plymouth by-election was held on 22 November 1871. The by-election was fought due to the resignation in order to become a Justice of the Court of Common Pleas of the incumbent Liberal MP, Robert Collier. It was won by the Conservative candidate Edward Bates.
