= Timothy Rogers (Puritan) =

English Puritian cleric

- Born: 1589
- Died: 1650?
- Occupation: Cleric

Timothy Rogers (1589 – 1650?) was an English Puritan cleric.

== Biography ==
Rogers was the eldest son of Vincent Rogers, rector of Stratford-le-Bow, Middlesex. He was born at Stratford and was baptised there on 30 March 1589. His father is supposed to have been a grandson of John Rogers (1500?–1555). Nehemiah Rogers was his younger brother.

From the title page of Timothy's ‘Roman-Catharist,’ it appears that he was a preacher at Steeple, Essex, in 1621, but he does not seem to have held the vicarage. In 1623 he became perpetual curate of Pontesbright or Chapel, Essex, and held this living until 1650. On 19 August 1636 he was appointed to the vicarage of All Saints', Sudbury, Suffolk. How long he held this preferment is not certain. In 1648 he was a member of the twelfth or Lexden classis in the Presbyterian organization for Essex, and in the same year he signed the ‘Testimony’ of Essex ministers as ‘pastor of Chappel.’

He probably died in 1650. His son Samuel was admitted vicar of Great Tey, Essex, on 27 January 1637–8, on the presentation of his uncle, Nehemiah.

== Family ==
Rogers was married twice;
Firstly to Jane with whom he had 8 children, Samuel, Hester, Dorcas, Timothy, Lydia, Zachary, John, Nehemiah
He then married Rachell Revel, 1 April 1640, Bures St Mary, Suffolk Died Oct 1655. Will written 10 November 1654, probate 6 December 1655

== Publications ==
Rogers published:

- ‘The Righteous Man's Evidence for Heaven,’ &c., 1619, 8vo (Watt); 8th edit. 1629, 24mo; 12th edit. 1637, 12mo; also Glasgow, 1784, 12mo; and in French, ‘L'Héritage du Ciel,’ Amsterdam, 1703, 8vo.
- ‘L’heritage du ciel‘
- ‘The Roman Catharist,’ &c. (1612), 4to.
- ‘Good Newes from Heaven,’ 1628, 24mo; 3rd edit. 1631, 12mo.
- ‘A Faithfull Friend true to the Soul … added, the Christian Jewell of Faith,’ 1653, 12mo.
