= William Hawkins (died c. 1554) =

English sea-captain

- Born: c. 1495; Plymouth, Devon
- Died: c. 1554–55
- Occupations: Merchant, Sea captain
- Spouse: Joan Trelawney (m.)
- Children: William Hawkins; John Hawkins

William Hawkins or Hawkyns (c. 1495 – 1554–55) was an English sea-captain and merchant and the first Englishman to sail to Brazil.

== Early life ==
William Hawkins, son of John Hawkins of Tavistock (died before 1490) and his wife Joan, daughter of William Amadas of Launceston, was probably born at Plymouth, where his father held land under the corporation. All evidence points to the Hawkinses being a Devonshire family, settled for many generations at Tavistock.

== Career ==
Early in the sixteenth century William Hawkins was a well-to-do freeman of Plymouth. He seems to have combined the businesses of shipowner, captain, and merchant, also serving occasionally as an officer of Henry VIII's ships. He may probably be identified with the Hawkins who in 1513 was master of the Great Galley, a ship of 700 tons and four hundred men. The captain of the Great Galley at this time was one John Flemyng, and in the same fleet William Gonson was captain of the Mary Grace. In the next generation the families of Flemyng and Hawkins intermarried with that of Gonson. We may suppose that he was the William Hawkins who in 1523, and again in 1524, was associated with John Amadas as a collector of the subsidy in Devonshire.

== Voyages to Brazil ==
Hawkins is described by Hakluyt as "a man for his wisdom, valour, experience, and skill in sea causes, much esteemed and beloved of King Henry VIII, and one of the principal sea-captains in the west parts of England in his time". Only three of his many voyages are specially mentioned. In or about 1528, in command of his own ship, the Pole, of 250 tons, he sailed for the Guinea Coast, where he traded with the locals for ivory and other commodities; and afterwards, "arriving on the coast of Brazil, used there such discretion and behaved himself so wisely with those savage people, that he grew into great familiarity and friendship with them". In a second voyage (c. 1530) "one of the savage kings of the country was contented to take ship with him and to be transported into England", Hawkins leaving behind in the country, as a pledge of his safety, "one Martin Cockeram of Plymouth". This Brazilian king was brought up to London and presented to Henry VIII at Whitehall, and a year later sailed with Hawkins on the homeward voyage. Unfortunately he died on the passage out, and it was feared that Cockeram's life might be in danger. The "savages" were, however, "persuaded of the honest dealing of our men"; the hostage was safely restored, and Hawkins returned to England with his "ship freighted and furnished with the commodities of the country". Hakluyt, writing in 1589, adds, on the testimony of Sir John Hawkins, that Cockeram "was living in the town of Plymouth within these few years".

== Politics ==
In 1532–3, and again in 1538–9, Hawkins was Mayor of Plymouth. He was the Member of Parliament for Plymouth in 1539, 1547, and 1553 (October to December).

== Personal life ==
Hawkins married Joan, daughter of William Trelawney, and left two sons, William (died 1589) and John. Sir Francis Drake is sometimes spoken of as the cousin of Sir John Hawkins, and it has been supposed that his mother must have been a sister of Sir John, a daughter, that is, of William Hawkins.

In February 1554–5 he is spoken of as "recently deceased".

== Sources ==
- Prince's Worthies of Devon, p. 389;
- Hakluyt, Richard (1589). Principal Navigations. Vol. iii. p. 700. This account of Hakluyt's has been reprinted in The Hawkins's Voyages, edited for the Hakluyt Society by Clements R. Markham, whose biographical introduction embodies most of the little that is known. Miss Mary W. S. Hawkins's Plymouth Armada Heroes contains some interesting notes extracted from the Plymouth records.

== Bibliography ==
- Hasted, Edward (1798). "Parishes: Chatham". The History and Topographical Survey of the County of Kent. Vol. 4. Canterbury: W. Bristow. pp. 191–226.
- Laughton, John Knox (1891). "Hawkins, William (d.1554?)" . In Stephen, Leslie; Lee, Sidney (eds.). Dictionary of National Biography. Vol. 25. London: Smith, Elder & Co. pp. 227–228.
- Virgoe, Roger (1982). "Hawkins, William (c.1495-1554/55), of Plymouth, Devon". In Bindoff, S. T. (ed.). The History of Parliament: the House of Commons. London: Boydell & Brewer. n.p.
