= Nehemiah Rogers =

British Royal Navy admiral

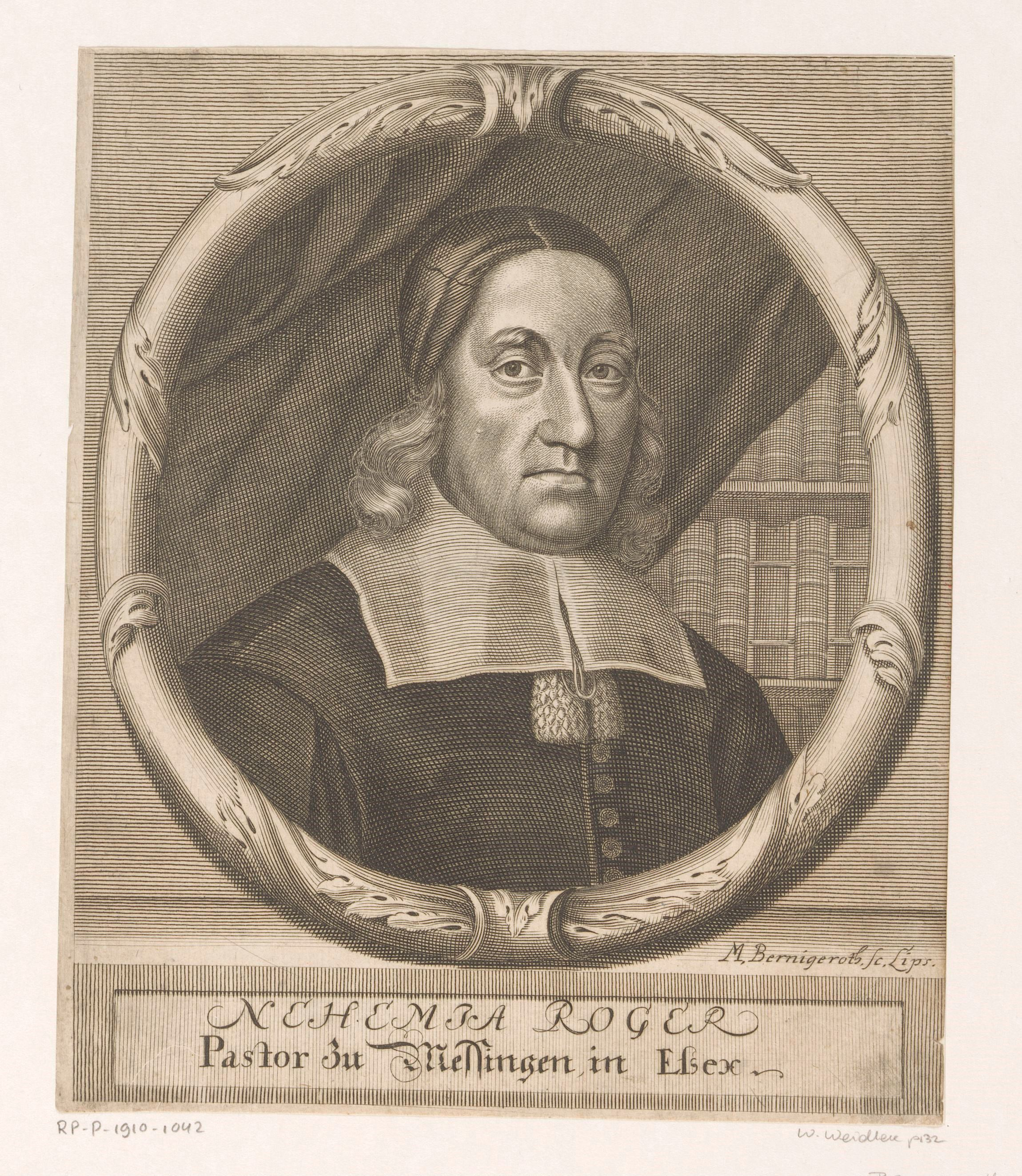
- Born: 1593
- Died: May 1660 (aged 66–67)
- Occupation: Cleric

Nehemiah Rogers (1593 – May 1660) was an English cleric.

== Biography ==
Rogers was baptised at Stratford on 20 October 1593. He was the second son of Vincent Rogers, minister of Stratford-le-Bow, Middlesex, by his wife Dorcas Young, whose second husband he was. Timothy Rogers was his elder brother. Vincent Rogers was probably a grandson of John Rogers the martyr (Chester, John Rogers, &c. 1861, p. 252 seq.).

Nehemiah was admitted to Merchant Taylors' School on 15 November 1602, and entered as a sizar at Emmanuel College, Cambridge, on 21 March 1612, and graduated M.A. in 1618. He also became a fellow of Jesus College. He was appointed assistant to Thomas Wood, the rector of St. Margaret's, Fish Street Hill, London, where he officiated until 13 May 1620. Through the influence of the widow of Sir Charles Chiborn, serjeant-at-law, he was then appointed to the vicarage of Messing, Essex (Christian Curtesie, dedication). On 25 May 1632 he was presented by Richard Hubert to the sinecure rectory of Great Tey, Essex, and he further received from the king the lapsed rectory of Gatton in Surrey, an advowson which he presented as a free gift in 1635 or early in 1636 to the president and fellows of St. John's, college, Oxford. The living was worth more than 100l. a year, and a letter from Archbishop Laud says it was given to the college out of friendship for him by ‘Mr. Nehemiah Rogers, now a minister in Essex, and a man of good note’ (Works, Oxford, 1860, vii. 242). On 1 May 1636 Rogers was presented by the king to a stall in Ely Cathedral. He exchanged the living of Great Tey with Thomas Wykes for that of St. Botolph's, Bishopsgate, in 1642. Upon Wykes's death Rogers presented his eldest son, Nehemiah, to the Tey rectory on 15 August 1644. The Messing living he appears to have resigned before May 1642.

Rogers was as uncompromising a royalist as a friend of Laud's was likely to be. About 1643 he was sequestered of both rectory and prebend. The vestry of St. Botolph's on 23 Feb. 1653 petitioned the Protector for liberty to the inhabitants to choose a minister in place of Rogers, but none appears to have been appointed. Rogers had many influential friends, and he obtained leave to continue preaching in Essex during the Commonwealth, mainly through the efforts of Edward Herries of Great Baddow, to whom one of his works is dedicated. For six years he was pastor to a congregation at St. Osyth, below Colchester, and next took up his abode for three years at Little Braxted, near Witham, where his friends Thomas Roberts and his wife Dorothy provided him with ‘light, lodging, and fyring.’ By them he was appointed in 1657 or early in 1658 to the living of Doddinghurst, near Brentwood. He died there suddenly in May 1660, and was buried there.

== Family ==
Rogers married Margaret, sister of William Collingwood, canon of St. Paul's after the Restoration. They had a daughter Mary, buried 1642, and at least three sons: Nehemiah (1621–1683), John Rogers (1627–1665?), and Zachary. The last graduated B.A. from Emmanuel College, Cambridge, 1648, was vicar of Tey 1661–1700, and of Chappel from 1674.

A portrait of Nehemiah Rogers, engraved by Berningroth of Leipzig, with a German inscription, is mentioned by Colonel Chester.

== Publications ==
Rogers wrote ably on the parables, in a style learned and full of quaint conceits. His expositions have become exceedingly scarce. The titles of his publications run:

- ‘Christian Curtesie, or St. Pavls Vltimum Vale,’ London, 1621, 4to.
- ‘A Strange Vineyard in Palæstrina,’ London, 1623, 4to.
- ‘The Trve Convert, containing three Parables: the Lost Sheepe, the Lost Groat [which Watt misreads for lost goat], and the Lost Sonne,’ London, 1632, 4to.
- ‘The Wild Vine, or an Exposition on Isaiah's Parabolicall Song of the Beloved,’ London, 1632, 4to.
- ‘A Visitation Sermon preached at Kelvedon, Sep. 3. 1631,’ London, 1632, 4to.
- ‘The Penitent Citizen, or Mary Magdalen's Conversion,’ London, 1640.
- ‘The Good Samaritan,’ London, 1640.
- ‘The Fast Friend, or a Friend at Midnight,’ London, 1658, 4to.
- ‘The Figgless Figgtree, or the Doome of a Barren and Unfruitful Profession layd open,’ London, 1659, 4to.
