= 1870 Plymouth by-election =

UK Parliamentary by-election

The 1870 Plymouth by-election was held on 15 August 1870. The by-election was held due to the incumbent Liberal MP, Sir Robert Porrett Collier, becoming Recorder of Bristol. It was retained unopposed by Collier.
