= Henry Strete =

16th-century English politician

Henry Strete (by 1481 – 1535/36) was an English politician.

He was a member (MP) of the parliament of England for Plymouth in 1510.
