= 1868 Plymouth by-election =

English parliamentary election

The 1868 Plymouth by-election was fought on 21 December 1868. The by-election was fought due to the incumbent Liberal MP, Sir Robert Porrett Collier, becoming Attorney General for England and Wales. It was retained by Collier who was unopposed.
