= Plymouth (constituency) =

Former parliamentary constituency in the United Kingdom

- Former borough constituency for the House of Commons

1442–1918
- Seats: Two
- Replaced by: Plymouth Drake and Plymouth Sutton

Plymouth was a parliamentary borough in Devon, which elected two members of parliament (MPs) to the House of Commons in 1298 and again from 1442 until 1918, when the borough was merged with the neighbouring Devonport and the combined area divided into three single-member constituencies.

== History ==
=== In the unreformed Parliament (to 1832) ===
Plymouth first sent MPs to the Parliament of 1298, but after that the right lapsed until being restored in 1442, after which it returned two members to each parliament. The borough originally consisted of the parish of Plymouth in Devon; in 1641, the parish was divided into two, St Charles and St Andrew, and both remained in the borough. (This included most of the town as it existed in mediaeval and early modern times, but only a fraction of the city as it exists today). Plymouth was a major port, both naval and commercial, and unlike many of the boroughs of the unreformed Parliament fully merited its status both for its importance and its population. (It was one of the few boroughs that retained both its members in the short-lived reform of the electoral system during the Commonwealth.) By the time of the Great Reform Act 1832, the population of the borough was a little over 31,000, but the whole conurbation including the two nearby towns of Devonport and Stonehouse, had about 75,000 inhabitants.

Until 1660, the right to vote in Plymouth was restricted to the corporation. In that year, the House of Commons determined that the right was vested in the "Mayor and Commonalty", but the term "commonalty" was ambiguous and in 1740 it was held to mean only the freemen of the town rather than all the freeholders, a much more restrictive franchise. This amounted to only about 200 voters in the 18th and early 19th century, and the highest number actually recorded as voting was 177. Since the corporation was responsible for electing its own successors and also controlled the admission of freemen, it was easy for any interest having once gained control of the borough to retain it. Because of the importance of the naval dockyard to the town's prosperity, Plymouth fell under the influence of the government very early, and from at least the late 17th century was regarded as a safe constituency where ministers could nominate both members with little likelihood of serious opposition.

The members so nominated almost invariably included a distinguished naval officer, or instead on occasions a high official of the Admiralty (who, of course, could bring valuable patronage to Plymouth). When the Admiralty nominated only one member, the other was often the choice of the governor of the garrison, though at the turn of the 19th century the Prince Regent (who was recorder of the borough) was generally allowed to pick both members.

Nevertheless, government control of the borough did not entirely preclude an influential role for local aristocratic or landed families, not least because somebody had to manage the government's patronage and decide how it should be exercised. Around 1700, the Trelawny family considered themselves "patrons" of Plymouth (which, together with their pocket boroughs of East Looe and West Looe in Cornwall, gave them control of six seats in Parliament). Charles Trelawny, who was Governor of Plymouth from 1696 to 1712, had power of nomination to both seats throughout this period, sitting himself as MP and choosing his brother for the other seat on one occasion.

Many of Plymouth's MPs, naval or otherwise, justified the borough's confidence in them by bringing patronage to the town. Namier and Brooke quote a letter from the First Lord of the Admiralty, Lord Sandwich, to the Plymouth MP Viscount Barrington, rebuking him for the extent of the continual requests he was making on their behalf; but many of these requests, it is clear, were nevertheless being met.

=== After the Reform Act (1832–1918) ===
The Great Reform Act left the borough of Plymouth unaltered, but its nature was affected radically. One change was the franchise reform, giving more than 1,400 of the inhabitants the vote. (Many of these, however, would have been able to vote for the county constituency of Devon before the Reform Act, since 40 shilling freeholders could vote for the county even if their property was within the borough boundaries.)

The second change was the creation of a new borough for the neighbouring town of Devonport, which included both Devonport and Stonehouse. These two towns, though outside the boundaries of Plymouth borough, had been influential on its politics, but now had two MPs of their own. As a result, the naval influence on Plymouth was somewhat reduced after 1832, though the importance of the dockyards to the economic interests of the constituency remained. In 1901, 7.9% of Plymouth's population were in defence-related occupations and a further 1.6% in boat or ship manufacture; but in Devonport the figures were 29.9% and 1.6% respectively.

Once governments could no longer easily abuse their powers of patronage to secure their seats in such constituencies, the naval connection could be a hindrance rather than a help: Sir Edward Clarke, Conservative MP for Plymouth in the latter years of the 19th century, had considerable difficulty securing re-election in 1892 because of local criticism of the Conservative government's Admiralty policy on payment for shipwrights. Nevertheless, the naval aspect was probably normally helpful to the Conservative vote at this period: by the early 20th century, Plymouth was one of England's most densely populated cities, and also had a high non-conformist population, which would normally have suggested a safe Liberal seat, but in fact the two parties polled fairly equally and Conservatives were elected more often than not.

=== Abolition ===
In 1914, the areas covered by the separate Plymouth and Devonport constituencies had been combined into a single county borough of Plymouth for local government purposes, and under the parliamentary boundary changes which came into effect at the general election of 1918 both two-member boroughs were abolished and the area of the county borough divided into single-member constituencies. The city's population was now adjudged to entitle it only to three MPs in place of the four it had had previously, and the new constituencies were called Plymouth, Devonport, Plymouth, Drake and Plymouth, Sutton. Of these, the Devonport division was very similar to the old Devonport borough, while the former Plymouth borough was split between the Drake and Sutton divisions.

== Members of Parliament ==
=== MPs 1442–1640 ===
Parliament	First member	Second member
1510	Henry Strete	John Bryan
1512	Robert Bowring	... Legh
1515	John Orenge	?
1523	?	
1529	Thomas Vowell	John Pollard
1536	John Pollard	?
1539	James Horsewell	William Hawkins
1542	George Ferrers	James Horsewell
1545	Thomas Sternhold	George Ferrers
1547	John Prideaux	William Hawkins
1553 (Mar)	George Ferrers	Roger Buttockshide
1553 (Oct)	Roger Buttockshide	William Hawkins
1554 (Apr)	John Malet	Richard Hooper
1554 (Nov)	Sir Thomas Knyvet	Roger Buttockshide
1555	Thomas Carew	John Young
1558	Humphrey Specote	Nicholas Slanning
1558/9	Sir Arthur Champernown	Nicholas Slanning
1562/3	Henry Champernown	William Peryam
1571	Sir Humphrey Gilbert	John Hawkins
1572	John Hawkins	Edmund Tremayne
1584	Henry Bromley	Christopher Harris
1586	Henry Bromley	Hugh Vaughan
1588	Miles Sandys	Reginald Nicholas
1593	Sir Francis Drake	Robert Basset (1573–1641) of Heanton Punchardon
1597	Warwick Hele	William Stallenge
1601	William Stallenge	James Bagg
1604–1611	Sir Richard Hawkins	James Bagg
1614	William Strode	Thomas Sherville
1621–1622	John Glanville	Thomas Sherville
1624	John Glanville	Thomas Sherville
1625	John Glanville	Thomas Sherville
1626	John Glanville	Thomas Sherville
1628–1629	John Glanville	Thomas Sherville
1629–1640	No Parliaments summoned	

=== MPs 1640–1918 ===
Year	First member	First party	Second member	Second party
April 1640	Robert Trelawney		John Waddon	
November 1640	Robert Trelawney	Royalist	John Waddon	Parliamentarian
1642	Sir John Yonge	Parliamentarian	John Waddon	Parliamentarian
December 1648	Yonge and Waddon excluded in Pride's Purge – both seats vacant			
1653	Plymouth was unrepresented in the Barebones Parliament			
1654	Christopher Silly		William Yeo	
1656	John Maynard		Timothy Alsop	
January 1659	Christopher Silly		Timothy Alsop	
May 1659	Plymouth was not represented in the restored Rump			
April 1660	John Maynard		Edmund Fowell	
June 1660	Sir William Morice		Samuel Trelawny	
1666	Sir William Morice		Sir Gilbert Talbot	
1677	John Sparke		Sir Gilbert Talbot	
1679	John Sparke		Sir John Maynard	
1680	Sir William Jones		Sir John Maynard	
1685	Bernard Granville		The Earl of Ranelagh	
January 1689	Sir John Maynard		Arthur Herbert	
July 1689	Sir John Maynard		John Granville	
1690	John Trelawny		John Granville	
1695	George Parker		John Granville	
1698	Major General Charles Trelawny		Sir John Rogers	
1701	Major General Charles Trelawny		Brigadier Henry Trelawny	
1702	Major General Charles Trelawny		John Woolcombe	
1705	Major General Charles Trelawny		Rear Admiral Sir George Byng	
1713	Sir John Rogers		Rear Admiral Sir George Byng	
1721	Sir John Rogers		Hon. Pattee Byng	
1722	William Chetwynd		Hon. Pattee Byng	
1727	Arthur Stert	Whig	George Treby	Whig
1728	Arthur Stert	Whig	Robert Byng	Whig
1739	Arthur Stert	Whig	John Rogers	
January 1740	Arthur Stert	Whig	Captain Charles Vanbrugh	
November 1740	Arthur Stert	Whig	Lord Henry Beauclerk	Whig
1741	Arthur Stert	Whig	Admiral Lord Vere Beauclerk	
1750	Arthur Stert	Whig	Captain Charles Saunders	
1754	The Viscount Barrington		Samuel Dicker	
1760	The Viscount Barrington		Vice Admiral George Pocock	
1768	The Viscount Barrington		Admiral Sir Francis Holburne	
1771	The Viscount Barrington		Admiral Sir Charles Hardy	
1778	Viscount Lewisham		Admiral Sir Charles Hardy	
1780	Vice Admiral George Darby		Sir Frederick Rogers	
1784	Captain John Macbride		Captain Robert Fanshawe	
1790	Captain John Macbride		Captain Alan Gardner	
1790	Sir Frederick Rogers		Captain Alan Gardner	
1796	Sir Frederick Rogers		William Elford	
1797	Francis Glanville		William Elford	
1802	Philip Langmead		William Elford	
March 1806	Thomas Tyrwhitt		William Elford	
November 1806	Thomas Tyrwhitt		Admiral Sir Charles Pole	
1812	Colonel Benjamin Bloomfield		Admiral Sir Charles Pole	
February 1818	Sir William Congreve	Tory	Admiral Sir Charles Pole	
June 1818	Sir William Congreve	Tory	Sir Thomas Byam Martin	Whig
1828	Sir George Cockburn	Tory	Sir Thomas Byam Martin	Whig
1832	John Collier	Whig	Thomas Bewes	Whig
1841	Thomas Gill	Whig	Viscount Ebrington	Whig
1847	Roundell Palmer	Peelite	Viscount Ebrington	Whig
1852	Charles John Mare	Conservative	(Sir) Robert Collier	Whig
1853	Roundell Palmer	Peelite	(Sir) Robert Collier	Whig
1857	James White	Whig	(Sir) Robert Collier	Whig
1859	Viscount Valletort	Conservative	(Sir) Robert Collier	Liberal
1861	Walter Morrison	Liberal	(Sir) Robert Collier	Liberal
1871	Walter Morrison	Liberal	Sir Edward Bates	Conservative
1874	Sampson Lloyd	Conservative	Sir Edward Bates	Conservative
April 1880	Peter Stewart Macliver	Liberal	Sir Edward Bates	Conservative
July 1880	Peter Stewart Macliver	Liberal	(Sir) Edward Clarke, QC	Conservative
1885	Sir Edward Bates	Conservative	(Sir) Edward Clarke, QC	Conservative
1892	Sir William Pearce	Conservative	(Sir) Edward Clarke, QC	Conservative
1895	Charles Harrison	Liberal	(Sir) Edward Clarke, QC	Conservative
1898	Sigismund Mendl	Liberal	(Sir) Edward Clarke, QC	Conservative
February 1900	Sigismund Mendl	Liberal	Hon. Ivor Guest	Conservative
October 1900	Henry Duke	Conservative	Hon. Ivor Guest	Conservative
April 1904	Henry Duke	Conservative	Hon. Ivor Guest	Liberal
1906	Thomas Dobson	Liberal	Charles Mallet	Liberal
January 1910	Aneurin Williams	Liberal	Charles Mallet	Liberal
December 1910	Waldorf Astor	Conservative	Arthur Benn	Conservative
1918	Constituency abolished			

== Elections ==
=== Elections in the 1830s ===
General election 1830: Plymouth
Party	Candidate	Votes	%
Whig	Thomas Byam Martin	Unopposed	
Tory	George Cockburn	Unopposed	
Whig hold			
Tory hold			

General election 1831: Plymouth
Party	Candidate	Votes	%
Whig	Thomas Byam Martin	101	39.6
Tory	George Cockburn	91	35.7
Whig	George Elliot	63	24.7
Turnout		146	76.0
Registered electors		192	
Majority		10	3.9
Whig hold			
Majority		28	11.0
Tory hold			

General election 1832: Plymouth
Party	Candidate	Votes	%
Whig	Thomas Bewes	Unopposed	
Whig	John Collier (MP)	Unopposed	
Registered electors		1,415	
Whig hold			
Whig gain from Tory			

General election 1835: Plymouth
Party	Candidate	Votes	%
Whig	John Collier (MP)	720	34.7
Whig	Thomas Bewes	687	33.1
Conservative	George Cockburn	667	32.2
Majority		20	0.9
Turnout		1,290	82.1
Registered electors		1,571	
Whig hold			
Whig hold			

General election 1837: Plymouth
Party	Candidate	Votes	%	±%
Whig	John Collier (MP)	780	30.4	−4.3
Whig	Thomas Bewes	772	30.1	−3.0
Conservative	George Cockburn	551	21.4	+5.3
Conservative	Price Blackwood	466	18.1	+2.0
Majority		221	8.7	+7.8
Turnout		1,309	72.3	−9.8
Registered electors		1,811		
Whig hold		Swing	−4.0	
Whig hold		Swing	−3.3	

=== Elections in the 1840s ===
General election 1841: Plymouth
Party	Candidate	Votes	%	±%
Whig	Thomas Gill	821	38.0	+7.6
Whig	Hugh Fortescue	787	36.4	+6.3
Conservative	John Johnson	552	25.6	−13.9
Majority		235	10.8	+2.1
Turnout		1,256 (est)	66.0 (est)	c. −6.3
Registered electors		1,903		
Whig hold		Swing	+7.3	
Whig hold		Swing	+6.6	

Fortescue was appointed a Lord Commissioner of the Treasury, requiring a by-election.

By-election, 11 July 1846: Plymouth
Party	Candidate	Votes	%	±%
Whig	Hugh Fortescue	716	79.2	+4.8
Chartist	Henry Vincent	188	20.8	New
Majority		528	58.4	+47.6
Turnout		904	46.5	−19.5
Registered electors		1,903		
Whig hold		Swing	N/A	

General election 1847: Plymouth
Party	Candidate	Votes	%	±%
Whig	Hugh Fortescue	921	36.4	−38.0
Peelite	Roundell Palmer	837	33.1	+7.5
Chartist	Charles Calmady	769	30.4	N/A
Turnout		1,682 (est)	77.4 (est)	+8.4
Registered electors		2,174		
Majority		84	3.3	−7.5
Whig hold		Swing	−22.8	
Majority		68	2.7	N/A
Peelite gain from Whig		Swing	+22.8	

=== Elections in the 1850s ===
General election 1852: Plymouth
Party	Candidate	Votes	%	±%
Conservative	Charles John Mare	1,036	31.2	−1.9
Whig	Robert Collier	1,004	30.3	+12.1
Whig	George Thomas Braine	906	27.3	+9.1
Radical	Bickham Escott	372	11.2	−19.2
Turnout		1,659 (est)	66.8 (est)	−10.6
Registered electors		2,482		
Majority		32	0.9	N/A
Conservative gain from Peelite		Swing	−6.3	
Majority		98	3.0	−0.3
Whig hold		Swing	+10.9	

Mare's election was declared void on petition due to bribery and corruption, causing a by-election.

By-election, 2 June 1853: Plymouth
Party	Candidate	Votes	%	±%
Peelite	Roundell Palmer	944	51.9	+20.7
Whig	George Thomas Braine	876	48.1	−9.5
Majority		68	3.8	N/A
Turnout		1,820	72.6	+5.8
Registered electors		2,508		
Peelite gain from Conservative		Swing	+15.1	

General election 1857: Plymouth
Party	Candidate	Votes	%	±%
Whig	Robert Collier	1,167	40.3	+10.0
Whig	James White	1,106	38.2	+10.9
Conservative	John Hardy	622	21.5	−9.7
Majority		484	16.7	+13.7
Turnout		1,759 (est)	67.5 (est)	+0.7
Registered electors		2,604		
Whig hold		Swing	+7.4	
Whig gain from Conservative		Swing	+7.9	

General election 1859: Plymouth
Party	Candidate	Votes	%	±%
Conservative	William Edgcumbe	1,153	36.0	+14.5
Liberal	Robert Collier	1,086	33.9	−6.4
Liberal	James White	964	30.1	−8.1
Majority		67	2.1	N/A
Turnout		2,178 (est)	80.5 (est)	+13.0
Registered electors		2,706		
Conservative gain from Liberal		Swing	+14.5	
Liberal hold		Swing	−6.8	

=== Elections in the 1860s ===
Edgcumbe succeeded to the peerage, becoming 4th Earl of Mount Edgcumbe and causing a by-election.

By-election, 31 October 1861: Plymouth
Party	Candidate	Votes	%	±%
Liberal	Walter Morrison	1,179	54.5	−9.5
Conservative	William Addington	984	45.5	+9.5
Majority		195	9.0	N/A
Turnout		2,163	77.8	−2.7
Registered electors		2,781		
Liberal gain from Conservative		Swing	−9.5	

Collier was appointed Solicitor General for England and Wales, requiring a by-election.

By-election, 17 October 1863: Plymouth
Party	Candidate	Votes	%	±%
Liberal	Robert Collier	Unopposed		
Liberal hold				

General election 1865: Plymouth
Party	Candidate	Votes	%	±%
Liberal	Robert Collier	1,299	35.5	+1.6
Liberal	Walter Morrison	1,218	33.2	+3.1
Conservative	Richard Stuart Lane	1,147	31.3	−4.7
Majority		71	1.9	N/A
Turnout		2,406 (est)	81.7 (est)	+1.2
Registered electors		2,944		
Liberal hold		Swing	+2.0	
Liberal gain from Conservative		Swing	+2.7	

General election 1868: Plymouth
Party	Candidate	Votes	%	±%
Liberal	Robert Collier	2,086	36.9	+1.4
Liberal	Walter Morrison	2,065	36.5	+3.3
Conservative	Richard Stuart Lane	1,506	26.6	−4.7
Majority		559	9.9	+8.0
Turnout		3,582 (est)	74.0 (est)	−7.7
Registered electors		4,840		
Liberal hold		Swing	+1.9	
Liberal hold		Swing	+2.8	

Collier was appointed Attorney General for England and Wales, requiring a by-election.

By-election, 21 December 1868: Plymouth
Party	Candidate	Votes	%	±%
Liberal	Robert Collier	Unopposed		
Liberal hold				

=== Elections in the 1870s ===
Collier was appointed Recorder of Bristol, causing a by-election.

By-election, 15 Aug 1870: Plymouth
Party	Candidate	Votes	%	±%
Liberal	Robert Collier	Unopposed		
Liberal hold				

Collier resigned after being appointed a Judge of the Court of Common Pleas, causing a by-election.

By-election, 22 Nov 1871: Plymouth
Party	Candidate	Votes	%	±%
Conservative	Edward Bates	1,753	53.7	+27.1
Liberal	Alfred Rooker	1,511	46.3	−27.1
Majority		242	7.4	N/A
Turnout		3,264	69.9	−4.1
Registered electors		4,671		
Conservative gain from Liberal		Swing	+27.1	

General election 1874: Plymouth
Party	Candidate	Votes	%	±%
Conservative	Edward Bates	2,045	27.4	+14.1
Conservative	Sampson Lloyd	2,000	26.8	+13.5
Liberal	Sir George Young, 3rd Baronet	1,714	23.0	−13.9
Liberal	Walter Morrison	1,700	22.8	−13.7
Majority		286	3.8	N/A
Turnout		3,730 (est)	78.9 (est)	+4.9
Registered electors		4,728		
Conservative gain from Liberal		Swing	+14.0	
Conservative gain from Liberal		Swing	+13.7	

=== Elections in the 1880s ===
General election 1880: Plymouth
Party	Candidate	Votes	%	±%
Conservative	Edward Bates	2,442	25.3	−2.1
Liberal	Peter Stewart Macliver	2,406	25.0	+2.2
Liberal	Sir George Young, 3rd Baronet	2,402	24.9	+1.9
Conservative	Sampson Lloyd	2,384	24.7	−2.1
Turnout		4,817 (est)	86.8 (est)	+7.9
Registered electors		5,552		
Majority		36	0.3	−3.5
Conservative hold		Swing	−2.0	
Majority		18	0.3	N/A
Liberal gain from Conservative		Swing	+2.2	

Bates was removed upon petition, causing a by-election.

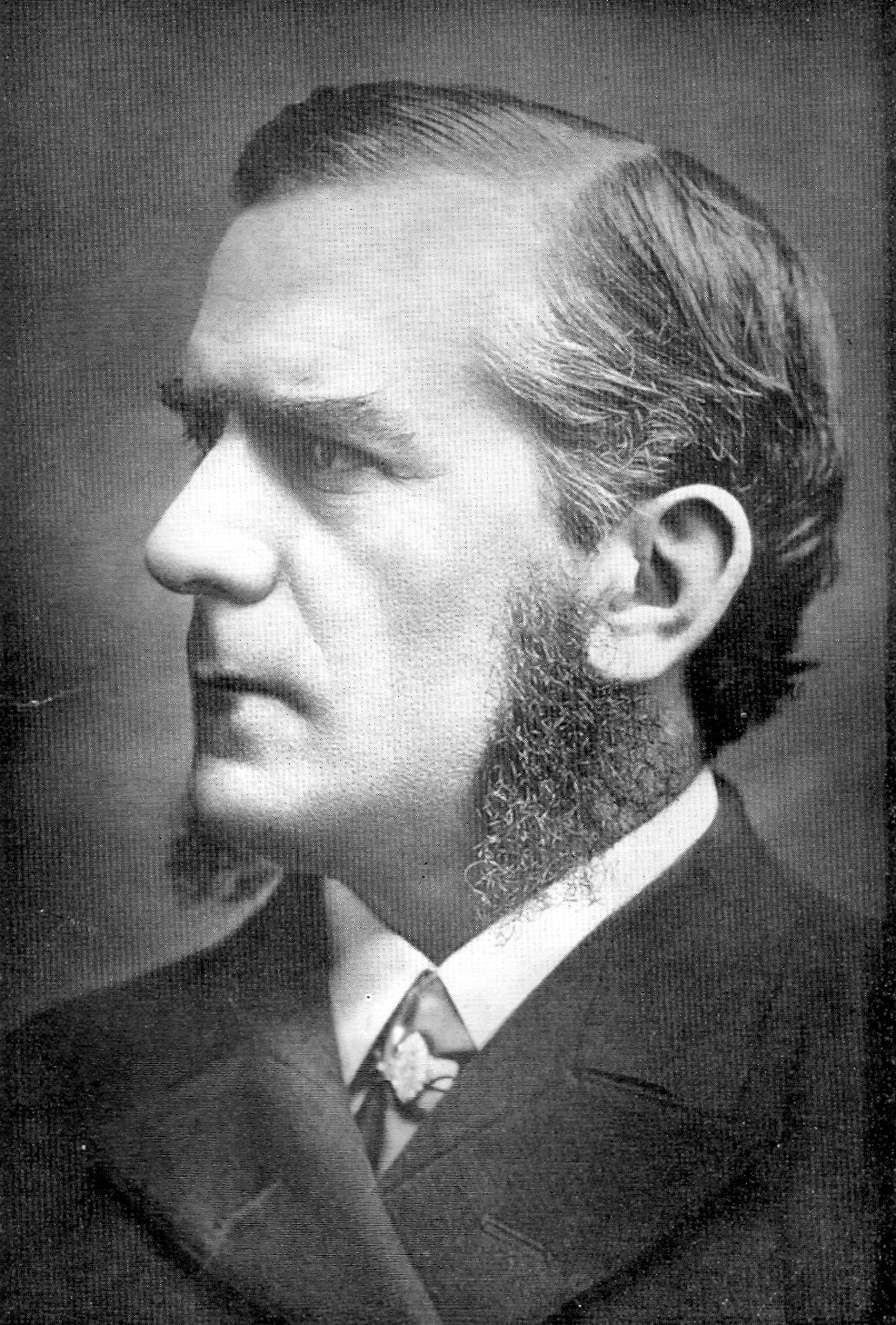
Clarke

By-election, 10 Jul 1880: Plymouth
Party	Candidate	Votes	%	±%
Conservative	Edward Clarke	2,449	51.5	+2.5
Liberal	Sir George Young, 3rd Baronet	2,305	48.5	−2.6
Majority		144	3.0	+2.7
Turnout		4,754	85.6	−1.2 (est)
Registered electors		5,552		
Conservative hold		Swing	+2.6	

Macliver

General election 1885: Plymouth
Party	Candidate	Votes	%	±%
Conservative	Edward Bates	4,354	26.0	+0.7
Conservative	Edward Clarke	4,240	25.4	+0.7
Liberal	Peter Stewart Macliver	4,132	24.8	−0.2
Liberal	Reginald Brett	3,968	23.8	−1.2
Majority		108	0.6	+0.3
Turnout		8,389	82.8	−4.0 (est)
Registered electors		10,130		
Conservative hold		Swing	+0.5	
Conservative gain from Liberal		Swing	+1.0	

Strachey

General election 1886: Plymouth
Party	Candidate	Votes	%	±%
Conservative	Edward Clarke	4,137	28.2	+2.8
Conservative	Edward Bates	4,133	28.1	+2.1
Liberal	Thomas English Stephens	3,255	22.1	−2.7
Liberal	Edward Strachey	3,175	21.6	−2.2
Majority		878	6.0	+5.4
Turnout		7,400 (est)	73.1	−9.7
Registered electors		10,130		
Conservative hold		Swing	+2.8	
Conservative hold		Swing	+2.2	

Clarke was appointed Solicitor General for England and Wales, requiring a by-election.

By-election, 11 Aug 1886: Plymouth
Party	Candidate	Votes	%	±%
Conservative	Edward Clarke	Unopposed		
Conservative hold				

=== Elections in the 1890s ===
General election 1892: Plymouth
Party	Candidate	Votes	%	±%
Conservative	Edward Clarke	5,081	25.5	−2.7
Conservative	William Pearce	5,081	25.5	−2.6
Liberal	Charles Harrison	4,921	24.6	+2.5
Liberal	George Lidgett	4,861	24.4	+2.8
Majority		160	0.9	−5.1
Turnout		10,086	81.1	+8.0
Registered electors		12,431		
Conservative hold		Swing	−2.6	
Conservative hold		Swing	−2.7	

Harrison

General election 1895: Plymouth
Party	Candidate	Votes	%	±%
Conservative	Edward Clarke	5,575	25.6	+0.1
Liberal	Charles Harrison	5,482	25.1	+0.5
Conservative	Evelyn Hubbard	5,456	25.0	−0.5
Liberal	Sigismund Mendl	5,298	24.3	−0.1
Turnout		11,006	81.8	+0.7
Registered electors		13,460		
Majority		277	1.3	+0.4
Conservative hold		Swing	+0.2	
Majority		26	0.1	N/A
Liberal gain from Conservative		Swing	−0.5	

Harrison's death caused a by-election.

Guest

1898 Plymouth by-election
Party	Candidate	Votes	%	±%
Liberal	Sigismund Mendl	5,966	50.7	+1.3
Conservative	Ivor Guest	5,802	49.3	−1.3
Majority		164	1.4	+1.3
Turnout		11,768	89.0	+7.2
Registered electors		13,223		
Liberal hold		Swing	+1.3	

=== Elections in the 1900s ===
1900 Plymouth by-election
Party	Candidate	Votes	%	±%
Conservative	Ivor Guest	Unopposed		
Conservative hold				

General election 1900: Plymouth
Party	Candidate	Votes	%	±%
Conservative	Henry Duke	6,009	26.4	+0.8
Conservative	Ivor Guest	6,005	26.4	+1.4
Liberal	Sigismund Mendl	5,460	24.0	−1.1
Liberal	Henry de Rosenbach Walker	5,264	23.2	−1.1
Majority		545	2.4	+1.1
Turnout		22,738	84.8	+3.0
Registered electors		13,566		
Conservative hold		Swing	+1.0	
Conservative gain from Liberal		Swing	+1.3	

Dobson

Mallet

General election 1906: Plymouth
Party	Candidate	Votes	%	±%
Liberal	Thomas Dobson	9,021	29.4	+5.4
Liberal	Charles Mallet	8,914	29.0	+5.8
Conservative	Henry Duke	6,547	21.3	−5.1
Conservative	HG Smith	6,234	20.3	−6.1
Majority		2,367	7.7	N/A
Turnout		30,716	85.3	+0.5
Registered electors		18,196		
Liberal gain from Conservative		Swing	+5.3	
Liberal gain from Conservative		Swing	+6.0	

=== Elections in the 1910s ===
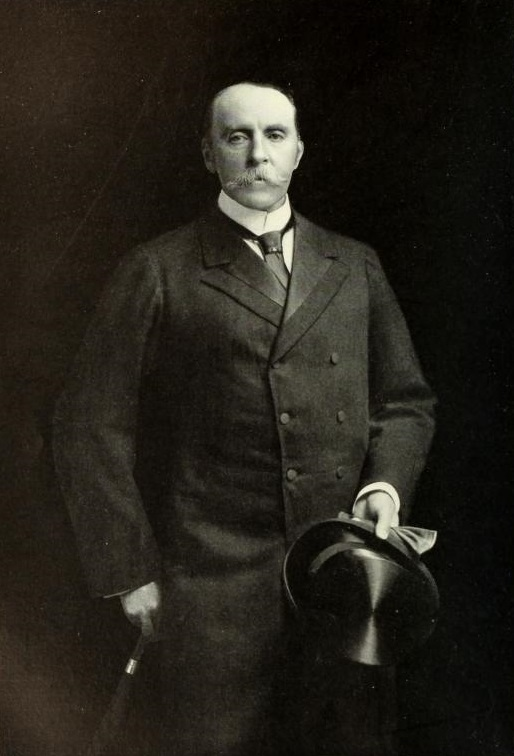
Durand

Williams

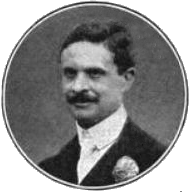
Astor

General election January 1910: Plymouth
Party	Candidate	Votes	%	±%
Liberal	Charles Mallet	8,091	25.8	−3.2
Liberal	Aneurin Williams	7,961	25.5	−3.9
Conservative	Waldorf Astor	7,650	24.5	+3.2
Conservative	Mortimer Durand	7,556	24.2	+3.9
Majority		311	1.0	−6.7
Turnout		31,258	87.9	+2.6
Registered electors		18,085		
Liberal hold		Swing	−3.2	
Liberal hold		Swing	−3.9	

General election December 1910: Plymouth
Party	Candidate	Votes	%	±%
Conservative	Waldorf Astor	8,113	26.4	+1.9
Conservative	Arthur Benn	7,942	25.9	+1.7
Liberal	Charles Mallet	7,379	24.0	−1.8
Liberal	Aneurin Williams	7,260	23.7	−1.8
Majority		563	1.9	N/A
Majority		853	2.7	N/A
Turnout		30,694	85.5	−2.4
Conservative gain from Liberal		Swing	+1.8	
Conservative gain from Liberal		Swing	+1.8	

General Election 1914/15:

Another General Election was required to take place before the end of 1915. The political parties had been making preparations for an election to take place and by July 1914, the following candidates had been selected;

- Unionist: Waldorf Astor, Arthur Benn
- Liberal: Thomas Dobson, JH McCawley Ryan

== Notes and references ==
- Robert Beatson, A Chronological Register of Both Houses of Parliament (London: Longman, Hurst, Res & Orme, 1807)
- D. Brunton & D. H. Pennington, Members of the Long Parliament (London: George Allen & Unwin, 1954)
- Cobbett's Parliamentary history of England, from the Norman Conquest in 1066 to the year 1803 (London: Thomas Hansard, 1808)
- The Constitutional Year Book for 1913 (London: National Union of Conservative and Unionist Associations, 1913)
- F W S Craig, British Parliamentary Election Results 1832–1885 (2nd edition, Aldershot: Parliamentary Research Services, 1989)
- Michael Kinnear, The British Voter (London: BH Batsford, Ltd, 1968)
- Lewis Namier & John Brooke, The History of Parliament: The House of Commons 1754–1790 (London: HMSO, 1964)
- J. E. Neale, The Elizabethan House of Commons (London: Jonathan Cape, 1949)
- T. H. B. Oldfield, The Representative History of Great Britain and Ireland (London: Baldwin, Cradock & Joy, 1816)
- Henry Pelling, Social Geography of British Elections 1885–1910 (London: Macmillan, 1967)
- J Holladay Philbin, Parliamentary Representation 1832 – England and Wales (New Haven: Yale University Press, 1965)
- Edward Porritt and Annie G Porritt, The Unreformed House of Commons (Cambridge University Press, 1903)
- Robert Walcott, English Politics in the Early Eighteenth Century (Oxford: Oxford University Press, 1956)
- Frederic A Youngs, jr, Guide to the Local Administrative Units of England, Vol I (London: Royal Historical Society, 1979)
- Leigh Rayment's Historical List of MPs – Constituencies beginning with "P" (part 2)
