= Sir William Pearce, 2nd Baronet =

Sir William George Pearce, 2nd Baronet (23 July 1861 – 2 November 1907) was a British industrialist and Conservative Party politician.

== Life ==
Pearce was son of the Clydeside shipbuilder Sir William Pearce and his wife Dinah Elizabeth, née Sowter. Born in Chatham, Kent, he was educated at Rugby School and at Trinity College, Cambridge, and was called to the bar at the Inner Temple in 1885.

After his father died in 1888, Pearce succeeded him to the baronetcy and as chairman of the Fairfield Shipbuilding and Engineering Company, but lacked his father's flair and drive. The business faltered, until by 1893 there was only one ship under a construction – a sailing vessel, in a yard noted for its expertise in engine technology. After the appointment in 1894 of Edward Shearer as general manager, the yard regained its former prominence.

Pearce was elected at the 1892 general election as Member of Parliament (MP) for the Plymouth constituency, but did not contest the 1895 general election. He was a keen country sportsman, and was noted for the shooting parties at his estate of Chilton Lodge at Leverton near Hungerford, Berkshire.

He was appointed Honorary Colonel of the 2nd Devonshire Artillery Volunteers on 10 June 1893.

He married Caroline Eva (née Coote) in 1905, but they had no children. He died in 1907 at his London home in Park Lane, and was buried at Chilton Foliat, near his country estate. His mother left an endowment for the maintenance of William and Caroline's memorials. The baronetcy became extinct on his death. In his will he left the residue of his estate, estimated at over £150,000, to Trinity College, Cambridge; this is believed to have been the college's most significant gift since its foundation in 1546 by Henry VIII.

Parliament of the United Kingdom
| Preceded by Sir Edward Clarke; Sir Edward Bates, Bt. | Member of Parliament for Plymouth; 1892–1895; With: Sir Edward Clarke | Succeeded by Sir Edward Clarke; Charles Harrison |
Baronetage of the United Kingdom
| Preceded by William Pearce | Baronet (of Cardell); 1888–1907 | Extinct |
