= List of mayors of Plymouth =

This is a list of some notable mayors and all the later lord mayors of the city of Plymouth in the United Kingdom.

Plymouth has elected a mayor annually since 1439. The city was awarded the dignity of a lord mayoralty by letters patent dated 6 May 1935. The dignity was granted as part of the silver jubilee celebrations of George V. When the city became a non-metropolitan borough in 1974 the honour was confirmed by letters patent dated 1 April 1974.

== Mayors of Plymouth ==
Year(s)	Name
1439-40	William Kethriche
1440-41	Walter Clovelly
1441-42	William Pollard
1442-43	John Schepeley
1443-45	William Nycott
1445-46	John Schepeley
1446-47	John Facye
1447-48	John Carwynyk
1448-49	John Facye
1449-50	John Paige
1450-52	Stephen Chepeman
1453-55	Vincent Petelysden
1455-56	John Dernford
1456-57	Vincent Petelysden
1457-58	John Carwynyk
1458-59	Thomas Tregle
1459-60	William Yogge
1460-61	John Pollard
1461-62	William Yogge
1462-63	John Page
1463-66	John Rowland
1466-67	Richard Bovy
1467-68	William Yogge
1468-69	John Page
1469-70	John Rowland
1470-71	William Yogge
1471-72	William Page
1472-73	Richard Bovy
1473-74	Nicholas Heynscott
1474-75	William Page
1475-77	Nicholas Heynscott
1477-78	John Pollard
1478-79	Nicholas Heynscott
1479-80	William Rodgers
1480-81	Thomas Tregarthen
1481-82	Thomas Tresawell
1482-83	Nicholas Heynscott
1483-84	Thomas Greyson
1484-85	Pers Carswell
1485-86	Thomas Tresawell
1486-87	Thomas Greyson
1487-88	Nicholas Heynscott
1488-89	Peryn Earle
1489-90	Thomas Greyson
1490-91	Nicholas Heynscott
1491-92	John Paynter
1492-94	William Thykpeny
1494-95	Thomas Bygporte
1495-96	Thomas Nycoll
1496-97	William Rogers
1497-98	Thomas Tresawell
1498-99	John Paynter
1499-1500	John Ilcombe
1528–29	James Horsewell
1532–33	William Hawkins
1535–36	James Horsewell
1538–39	William Hawkins
1542–43	James Horsewell
1548–49	Richard Hooper
1564–65	Nicholas Slanning
1581–82	Sir Francis Drake
1595–96	James Bagg
1601	William Parker
1603–04	Sir Richard Hawkins
1608–09	Thomas Sherwill
1617–18	Thomas Sherwill
1619	Thomas Fones (d.1638)
1626–27	Thomas Sherwill
1631–32	John Waddon Jnr
1633–34	Robert Trelawney Jnr
1642–43	Philip Francis
1662–63	William Jennens
1686–87	John Trelawny
1694–95	James Yonge
1722–23	Sir John Rogers, 2nd Baronet
1728-29	John Rogers
1741–42 (part)	Sir John Rogers, 2nd Baronet
1743-44	John Rogers
1773-74	Sir F L Rogers
1800–01	Philip Langmead
1819	Richard Arthur
1829–30	William F Wise, Capt R N
1838	Henry Richard Glynn
1887–90	Henry John Waring
1901–02	Joseph Arthur Bellamy
1902–03	H. Hurrell
1913–16	Thomas Baker
1917-19	Joseph Pearce Brown
1926–27	James John Hamlyn Moses

== Lord Mayors of Plymouth ==
Year	Name
1935	Hubert M Medland
1936	Walter R Littleton
1937	Solomon Stephens
1938	George S Scoble
1939–1944	Waldorf Astor, 2nd Viscount Astor
1944	Henry George Mason
1945	Isaac Foot
1946	W Harry Taylor
1947–1949	Heber James Perry
1949	Francis George Leatherby
1950	Jacquetta Marshall
1951	Randolph H Baker
1952	Henry E Wright
1953	Sir James Clifford Tozer
1954	E W Perry
1955	Edwin Broad
1956	William James Oats
1957	Leslie Francis Paul
1958	George John Wingett
1959	Percy N Washbourn
1960	Frederick John Stott
1961	Arthur Goldberg
1962	Henry George Mason
1963	Harold M Pattinson
1964	Thomas H Watkins
1965	Percival D Pascho
1966	Thomas H L Stanbury
1967	Frank Chapman
1968	Ivor Clarence Lowe
1969	George E H Creber
1970	Eric Donald Nuttal
1971	Dorothy F Innes
1972	Jack Lester Luce
1973	John Clifford Porter
1974 (part)	George E H Creber
1974	Frederick W Johnson
1975	William I Thompson
1976	Arthur R S Floyd
1977	Robert R Thornton
1978	William Evan Evans
1979	Graham Joseph Jinks
1980	Ronald George King
1981	Ralph Vernon Morrell
1982	Reginald C J Scott
1983	Derek Mitchell
1984	Peter Whitfeld
1985	John Leslie Mills
1986	William H C Glanville
1987	Anthony H Parish
1988	Gordon A Draper
1989	Dennis H Dicker
1990	John Finnigan
1991	Catherine E Easton
1992	Ronald Simmonds
1993	John Bird Richards
1994	Walter Thomas Ainsworth
1995	Peter Nelson Wood
1996	Sylvia Yvonne Bellamy
1997	Joan Iris Stopporton
1998	Eileen Ruby Evans
1999	Thomas E J Savery
2000	Dennis John Camp
2001	David Frank Viney
2002	Ian Peter Gordon
2003	David John Stark
2004	Bernard Claude Miller
2005	Patrick John Nicholson
2006	Michael Charles John Fletcher
2007	David John James
2008	Brian Vincent
2009	Kenneth James Foster
2010	Mary Elizabeth Aspinall
2011	Peter Brookshaw
2012	Michael Wright
2013	Vivien Anne Pengelly
2014	Michael Robert Fox
2015	Dr John Mahony
2016	Pauline Murphy
2017	Wendy Foster
2018	Sam Davey
2019	Richard Ball
2020	Chris Mavin
2021	Terri Beer
2022	Sue Dann
2023	Mark Shayer
2024	Tina Tuohy
2025	Kathy Watkin
2026	Kevin Sproston
