= Guildford Borough Council elections =

Local government elections in Surrey, England

Guildford Borough Council in Surrey, England was elected every four years. The council is due to be abolished on 1 April 2027 following structural changes to local government in Surrey.

== Council elections ==
Composition of the council
Year	Conservative	Liberal Democrats (Note: Includes totals for the predecessors of the Liberal Democrats, the Liberal Party and SDP (both of which participated in the Alliance).)	Labour	Green (Note: Includes totals for the predecessors of the Green Party of England and Wales, the Ecology Party and Green Party UK.)	R4GV	GGG	Independents & Others	Council control after election
Local government reorganisation; council established (42 seats)
1973	27	5	8	–	–	–	2	Conservative
New ward boundaries (45 seats)
1976	35	2	6	0	–	–	2	Conservative
1979	34	3	6	0	–	–	2	Conservative
1983	31	7	6	0	–	–	1	Conservative
1987	29	10	6	0	–	–	0	Conservative
1991	19	19	6	0	–	–	1	No overall control
1995	13	23	6	0	–	–	3	Liberal Democrats
1999	17	20	6	0	–	–	2	No overall control
New ward boundaries (48 seats)
2003	26	19	2	0	–	–	1	Conservative
2007	26	22	0	0	–	–	0	Conservative
2011	34	12	2	0	–	–	0	Conservative
2015	35	9	1	0	–	3	0	Conservative
2019	9	17	2	1	15	4	0	No overall control
New ward boundaries (48 seats)
2023	10	25	3	0	7	3	0	Liberal Democrats

=== 1973 ===
1973 Election
Party	Seats
Conservative	29
Labour	6
Liberal	5
Independent	2

Number of councillors per ward is shown in brackets after the ward name.

Wards won by the Conservatives – Artington, Compton, Puttenham, Seale and Tongham, Shackleford and Wanborough (2); Ash (5); Effingham (1); Merrow and Burpham (5); Normandy (1); Onslow (3); Pirbright (1); Ripley, Wisley and Ockham (1); Send (2); Shalford (1); Stoughton (2); Worplesdon (2)

Wards won by Labour – Stoke (3); Westborough (3)

Ward won by the Liberals – Friary and St Nicolas (3)

Ward won by Independents – Aldbury, Shere and St Martha's (2)

Wards electing councillors of more than one party – East Clandon, West Clandon, East Horsley and West Horsley (3 – 2 Con; 1 Lib); Holy Trinity (2 – 1 Con, 1 Lib)

This was the first election of councillors for the new Guildford Borough Council formed as a successor to the Guildford Municipal Borough Council (the town council) and the Guildford Rural District Council.

There was a partial redrawing of ward boundaries and alteration of numbers of councillors elected per ward in the run up to the 1973 elections in Guildford. One example was Friary and St Nicolas which had been separate wards in the old Guildford Municipal Borough Council in 1972 but which were merged to form a new joint Friary and St Nicolas ward in time for these 1973 elections. A further redrawing of Guildford ward boundaries would occur in time for the next full council election in 1976.

=== 1976 ===
1976 Election
Party	Seats
Conservative	35
Labour	6
Liberal	2
Independent	2

Number of councillors per ward is shown in brackets after the ward name.

Wards won by the Conservatives – Ash (3); Ash Vale (2); Christchurch (2); Clandon and Horsley (3); Effingham (1); Lovelace (1); Merrow and Burpham (3); Normandy (1); Pilgrims (2); Pirbright (1); Onslow (3); Send (2); Shalford (1); Stoughton (3); Worplesdon (3)

Wards won by Labour – Stoke (3); Westborough (3)

Ward won by Independent Conservative – Tongham (1)

Wards electing councillors of more than one party – Friary and St Nicolas (3 – 2 Con, 1 Lib); Holy Trinity (2 – 1 Con, 1 Lib); Tillingbourne (2 – 1 Con, 1 Ind)

Guildford ward boundaries were redrawn in time for the 1976 council elections. Changes included:

• Ash ward was split into two wards Ash plus Ash Vale;

• a new ward, Christchurch, was created from part of Stoke ward and part of Merrow and Burpham ward;

• Artington, Compton, Puttenham, Seale and Tongham, Shackleford and Wanborough ward was split into two wards Tongham plus Pilgrims;

• Aldbury, Shere and St Martha's ward was renamed Tillingbourne;

• East Clandon, West Clandon, East Horsley and West Horsley ward was renamed Clandon and Horsley; and

• Ripley, Wisley and Ockham ward was renamed Lovelace.

Both Pirbright and Lovelace wards had only one candidate who stood at the 1976 council elections. The respective candidate standing in each of these two wards was thus returned without the need for a vote.

=== 1979 ===
1979 Election
Party	Seats
Conservative	34
Labour	6
Liberal	3
Independent	2

Number of councillors per ward is shown in brackets after the ward name.

Wards won by the Conservatives – Ash (3); Ash Vale (2); Christchurch (2); Clandon and Horsley (3); Effingham (1); Holy Trinity (2); Merrow and Burpham (3); Normandy (1); Pilgrims (2); Pirbright (1); Onslow (3); Send (2); Shalford (1); Tongham (1); Worplesdon (3)

Wards won by Labour – Stoke (3); Westborough (3)

Ward won by Independent – Lovelace (1)

Wards electing councillors of more than one party – Friary and St Nicolas (3 – 2 Con, 1 Lib); Stoughton (3 – 1 Con, 2 Lib); Tillingbourne (2 – 1 Con, 1 Ind)

These 1979 council elections coincided with the general election resulting in a turnout of 74.8%. This contrasts with the turnout of 40–50% which occurred in every other full Guildford Borough Council election between 1973 and 1995.

Send ward had only two candidates for the two council positions up for election in 1979. These two candidates were consequently returned without the need for a vote. This is the last time, to date (2015), that any ward in a full Guildford Borough Council election has returned councillors unopposed.

In 1979 Labour finished second in number of councillors and in percentage vote. In Guildford Borough Council elections following the 1979 one, Labour has, to date (2015), never again finished in the top two in either number of councillors or percentage vote.

=== 1983 ===
1983 Election
Party	Seats
Conservative	31
Labour	6
SDP-Liberal Alliance	7
Independent	1

Number of councillors per ward is shown in brackets after the ward name.

Wards won by the Conservatives – Ash (3); Ash Vale (2); Christchurch (2); Clandon and Horsley (3); Effingham (1); Lovelace (1); Holy Trinity (2); Merrow and Burpham (3); Normandy (1); Pilgrims (2); Pirbright (1); Send (2); Shalford (1); Tongham (1); Worplesdon (3)

Wards won by Labour – Stoke (3); Westborough (3)

Ward won by SDP-Liberal Alliance – Friary and St Nicolas (3)

Wards electing councillors of more than one party – Onslow (3 – 1 Con, 2 Alliance); Stoughton (3 – 1 Con, 2 Alliance); Tillingbourne (2 – 1 Con, 1 Ind)

The SDP was formed in 1981. The 1983 elections were the first full Guildford Borough Council elections fought by the new SDP-Liberal Alliance.

The 1983 elections saw every ward in Guildford contested by at least one Conservative candidate and at least one Labour candidate. The SDP-Liberal Alliance contested every ward in Guildford bar two Normandy and Tongham.

=== 1987 ===
1987 Election
Party	Seats
Conservative	30
Labour	6
SDP-Liberal Alliance	9
Independent	0

Number of councillors per ward is shown in brackets after the ward name.

Wards won by the Conservatives – Ash (3); Ash Vale (2); Christchurch (2); Clandon and Horsley (3); Effingham (1); Lovelace (1); Holy Trinity (2); Merrow and Burpham (3); Pilgrims (2); Pirbright (1); Send (2); Shalford (1); Tillingbourne (2); Tongham (1); Worplesdon (3)

Wards won by Labour – Stoke (3); Westborough (3)

Wards won by SDP-Liberal Alliance – Friary and St Nicolas (3); Normandy (1); Stoughton (3)

Ward electing councillors of more than one party – Onslow (3 – 1 Con, 2 Alliance)

In 1987, the Conservatives won their fifth successive Guildford Borough Council election.

1987 marked the low point for independents contesting Guildford Borough Council elections. There was only one independent candidate in any ward in Guildford. He stood in Worplesdon and finished in seventh place out of the ten candidates up for election in that ward; the top three getting elected.

Conservatives contested every ward in Guildford in this election. Labour contested every ward bar Shalford and the SDP-Liberal Alliance contested every ward except Tillingbourne.

Borough boundary changes took place but the number of seats remained the same.

=== 1991 ===
1991 Election
Party	Seats
Conservative	19
Labour	6
Liberal Democrats	19
Independent	1

Number of councillors per ward is shown in brackets after the ward name.

Wards won by the Conservatives – Clandon and Horsley (3); Effingham (1); Lovelace (1); Merrow and Burpham (3); Pilgrims (2); Pirbright (1); Send (2); Shalford (1); Worplesdon (3)

Wards won by Labour – Stoke (3); Westborough (3)

Wards won by Liberal Democrats – Ash (3); Ash Vale (2); Friary and St Nicolas (3); Holy Trinity (2); Normandy (1); Onslow (3); Stoughton (3); Tongham (1)

Wards electing councillors of more than one party – Christchurch (2 – 1 Con, 1 LibD); Tillingbourne (2 – 1 Con, 1 Ind)

Between the 1987 and 1991 council elections the Liberals and SDP had merged. The new party was initially called the Social and Liberal Democrat Party, but was renamed the Liberal Democrat Party in the second half of 1989.

The 1991 council elections saw the Conservatives lose control of Guildford Borough Council for the first time since it was created in the early 1970s. Conservatives and Liberal Democrats ended up tied on 19 councillors each.

Each ward was contested by at least one Conservative and one Liberal Democrat candidate. Labour contested every ward bar two Lovelace and Pirbright. Ten wards, the eight town wards plus Shalford and Worplesdon, were contested by "All Night" candidates.

An independent was returned to the council representing Tillingbourne. At every full council election between 1973 and 2003, except 1987, Tillingbourne (and its predecessor Aldbury, Shere and St Martha's) returned at least one independent councillor. In 1987 no independent candidate had contested the election in Tillingbourne.

=== 1995 ===
1995 Election
Party	Seats
Conservative	13
Labour	6
Liberal Democrats	23
Independent	3

Number of councillors per ward is shown in brackets after the ward name.

Wards won by the Conservatives – Clandon and Horsley (3); Effingham (1); Lovelace (1); Pilgrims (2); Pirbright (1); Send (2); Shalford (1)

Wards won by Labour – Stoke (3); Westborough (3)

Wards won by Liberal Democrats – Friary and St Nicolas (3); Holy Trinity (2); Merrow and Burpham (3); Normandy (1); Onslow (3); Stoughton (3); Tongham (1); Worplesdon (3)

Ward won by Putting Ash Vale First – Ash Vale (2)

Wards electing councillors of more than one party – Ash (3 – 1 Con, 2 LibD); Christchurch (2 – 1 Con, 1 LibD); Tillingbourne (2 – 1 LibD, 1 Ind)

To date (2015), 1995 was the Conservatives worst ever electoral performance on Guildford Borough Council and the Liberal Democrats best. The Liberal Democrats won control of the council with a majority of 1.

In Ash Vale, a councillor who had been elected in 1991 as a Liberal Democrat, but had subsequently resigned from the party, stood and was elected along with another candidate under the banner "Putting Ash Vale First".

Borough boundary changes took place but the number of seats remained the same.

=== 1999 ===
1999 Election
Party	Seats
Conservative	17
Labour	6
Liberal Democrats	20
Independent	2

Number of councillors per ward is shown in brackets after the ward name.

Wards won by the Conservatives – Ash (3); Ash Vale (2); Clandon and Horsley (3); Effingham (1); Lovelace (1); Normandy (1); Pilgrims (2); Pirbright (1); Send (2); Shalford (1)

Wards won by Labour – Stoke (3); Westborough (3)

Wards won by Liberal Democrats – Friary and St Nicolas (3); Holy Trinity (2); Merrow and Burpham (3); Onslow (3); Stoughton (3); Worplesdon (3)

Ward won by independent – Tongham (1)

Wards electing councillors of more than one party – Christchurch (2 – 1 Con, 1 LibD); Tillingbourne (2 – 1 LibD, 1 Ind)

In 1999, for the first time the percentage turnout in a full Guildford Borough Council election fell below 40% as only 36.2% of people voted.

1999 was the first election for Guildford Borough Council in which all three main political parties Conservatives, Labour and Liberal Democrats each contested every ward.

The Liberal Democrats had lost majority control of Guildford Borough Council in February 1997 as a result of councillors resigning from the party. Following the 1999 election the council remained no overall control with the Liberal Democrats as the largest group on the council.

=== 2003 ===
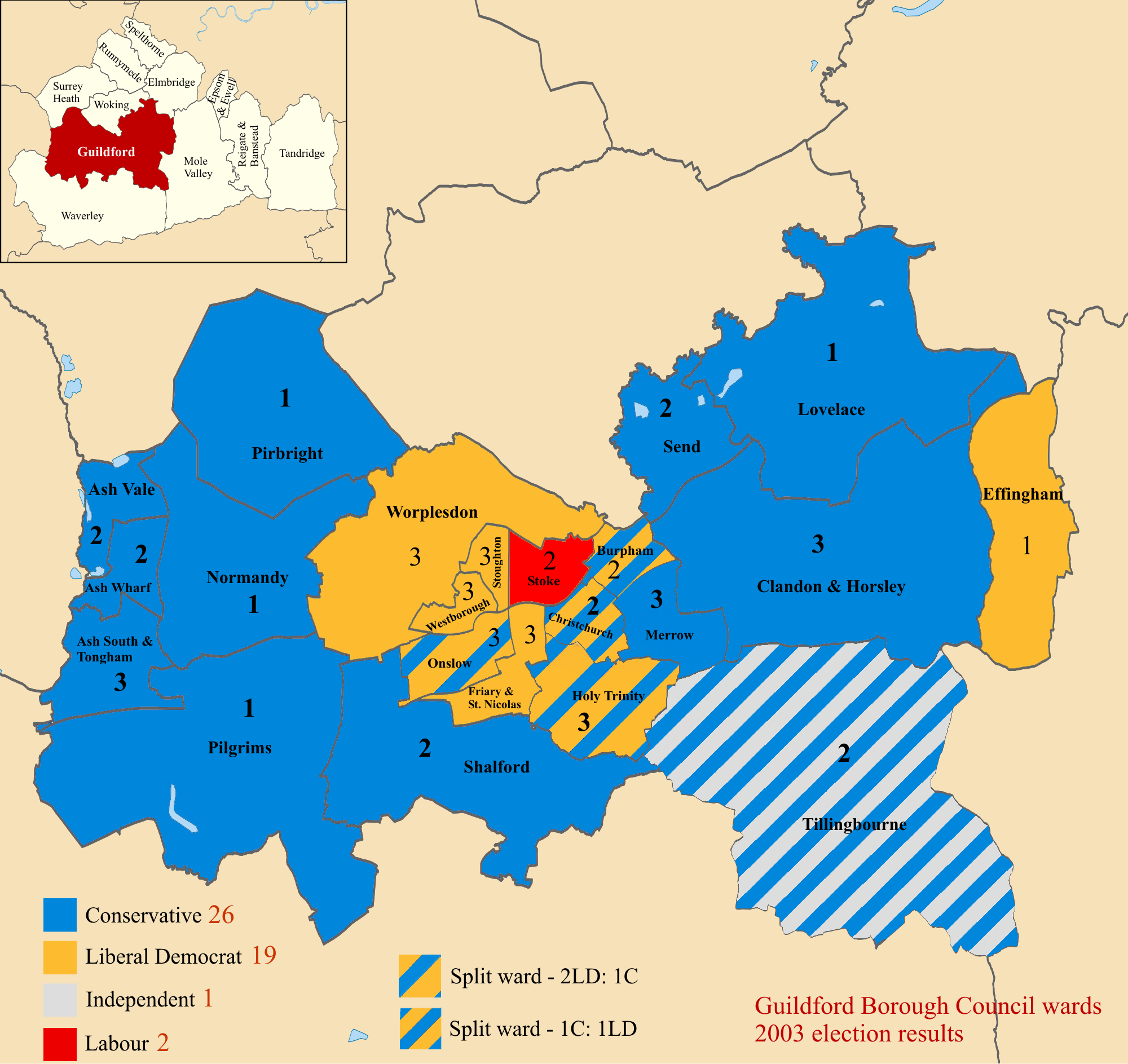
2003 election Guildford Borough Council

2003 Election
Party	Seats
Conservative	26
Labour	2
Liberal Democrats	19
Independent	1

Number of councillors per ward is shown in brackets after the ward name.

Wards won by the Conservatives – Ash South & Tongham (3); Ash Vale (2); Ash Wharf (2); Clandon & Horsley (3); Lovelace (1); Merrow (3); Normandy (1); Pilgrims (1); Pirbright (1); Send (2); Shalford (2)

Ward won by Labour – Stoke (2)

Wards won by Liberal Democrats – Effingham (1); Friary and St Nicolas (3); Stoughton (3); Westborough (3); Worplesdon (3)

Wards electing councillors of more than one party – Burpham (2 – 1 Con, 1 LibD); Christchurch (2 – 1 Con, 1 LibD); Holy Trinity (3 – 1 Con, 2 LibD); Onslow (3 – 1 Con, 2 LibD); Tillingbourne (2 – 1 Con, 1 Ind)

The 2003 elections were conducted by an all postal ballot. Turnout at 53.4% for the full council elections was above 50% for only the second time in Guildford Borough Council history, the other occasion being in 1979 when the elections were held on the same day as the general election.

Between 1976 and 1999 Guildford Borough Council had been divided into 21 wards with a total of 45 councillors. Boundary changes, prior to the 2003 elections, saw the council divided into 22 wards with a total of 48 councillors. Merrow and Burpham ward was divided into two wards - Merrow ward and Burpham ward.

For only the second time all three main parties Conservatives, Labour and Liberal Democrats each contested every ward in a full Guildford Borough Council election.

The Conservatives won control of the council with a majority of four.

Labour lost Westborough ward, thus ending a period of continuous Labour representation for this ward since 1934.

=== 2007 ===
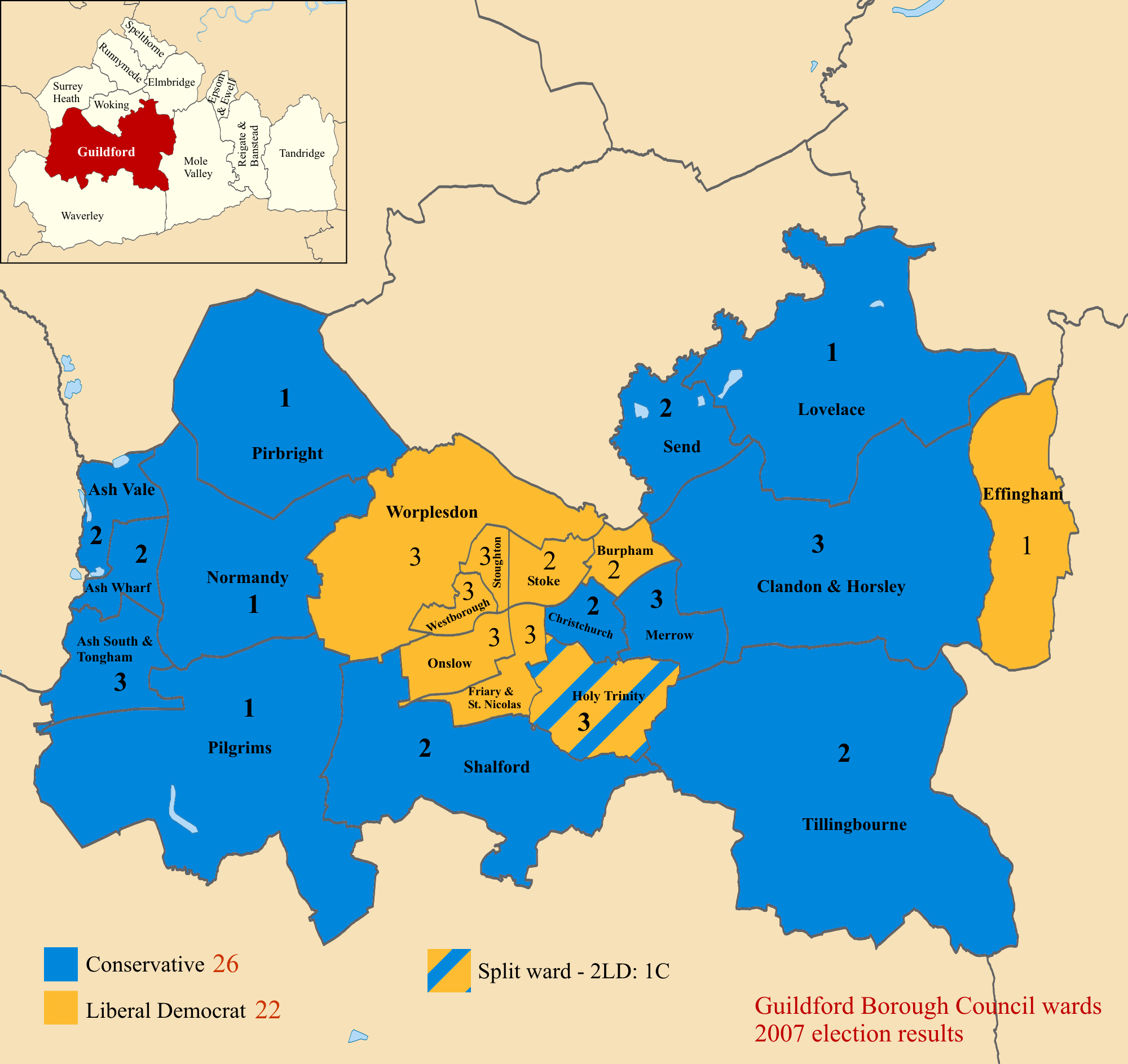
2007 election Guildford Borough Council

2007 Election
Party	Seats
Conservative	26
Labour	0
Liberal Democrats	22
Independent	0

Number of councillors per ward is shown in brackets after the ward name.

Wards won by the Conservatives – Ash South & Tongham (3); Ash Vale (2); Ash Wharf (2); Christchurch (2); Clandon & Horsley (3); Lovelace (1); Merrow (3); Normandy (1); Pilgrims (1); Pirbright (1); Send (2); Shalford (2); Tillingbourne (2)

Wards won by Liberal Democrats – Burpham (2); Effingham (1); Friary and St Nicolas (3); Onslow (3); Stoke (2); Stoughton (3); Westborough (3); Worplesdon (3)

Wards electing councillors of more than one party – Holy Trinity (3 – 1 Con, 2 LibD)

The Conservatives retained control of the council in the 2007 elections with a majority of four over the Liberal Democrats; these being the only two groups with elected councillors in 2007. Labour lost their last two councillors. No independents were elected.

Conservative and Liberal Democrat candidates contested every ward in Guildford. Labour did not contest seven wards Ash South & Tongham; Ash Vale; Ash Wharf; Effingham; Normandy; Pilgrims; and Pirbright.

=== 2011 ===
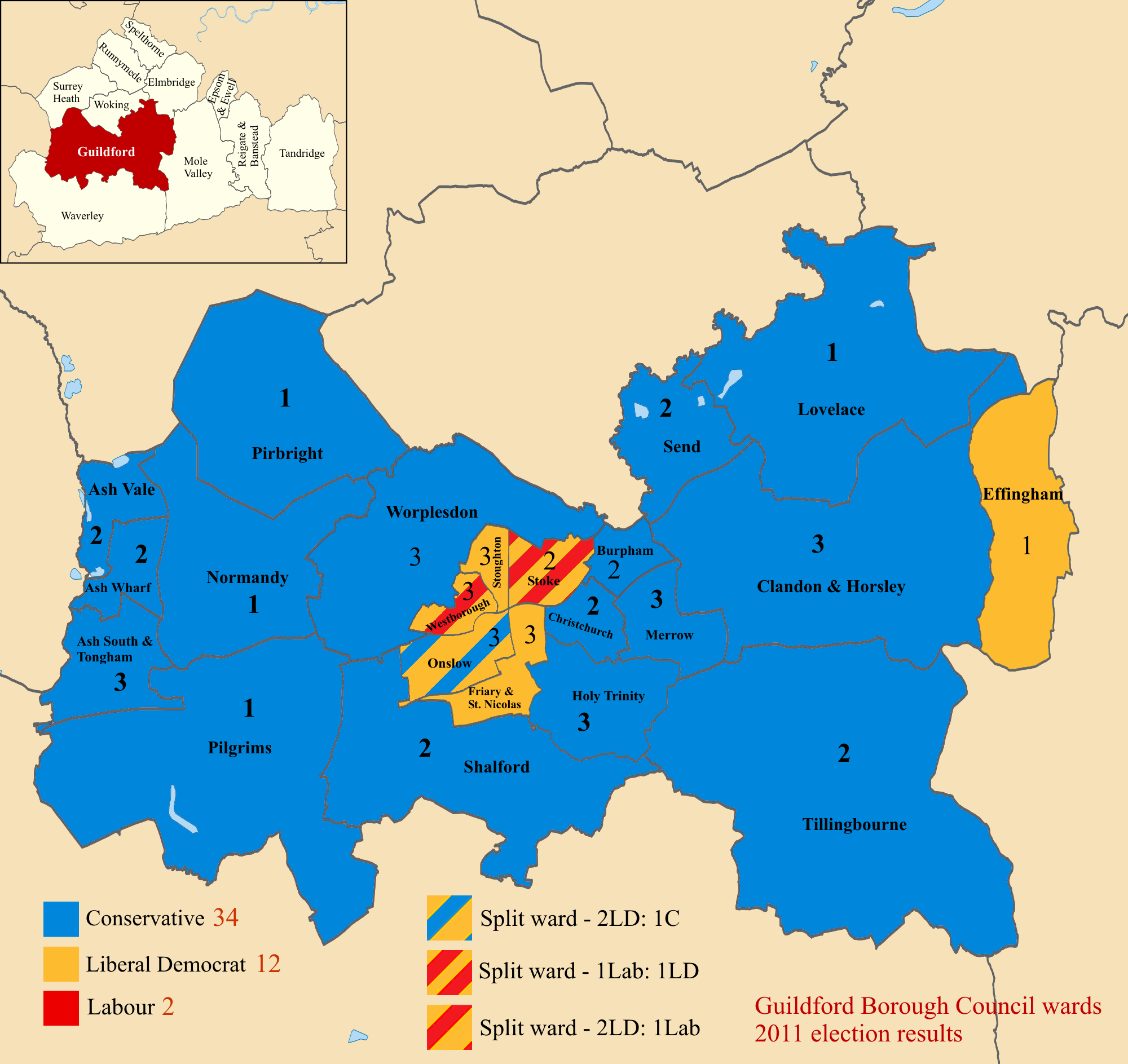
2011 election Guildford Borough Council

2011 Election
Party	Seats
Conservative	34
Labour	2
Liberal Democrats	12
Independent	0

Number of councillors per ward is shown in brackets after the ward name.

Wards won by the Conservatives – Ash South & Tongham (3); Ash Vale (2); Ash Wharf (2); Burpham (2); Christchurch (2); Clandon & Horsley (3); Lovelace (1); Holy Trinity (3); Merrow (3); Normandy (1); Pilgrims (1); Pirbright (1); Send (2); Shalford (2); Tillingbourne (2); Worplesdon (3)

Wards won by Liberal Democrats – Effingham (1); Friary and St Nicolas (3); Stoughton (3)

Wards electing councillors of more than one party – Onslow (3 – 1 Con, 2 LibD); Stoke (2 – 1Lab, 1LibD); Westborough (3 – 1Lab, 2LibD)

The Conservatives retained control of Guildford council with an increased majority of 20 seats. Labour returned to the council, after a four-year absence, with 2 seats.

Only the Conservatives contested every ward in Guildford, in 2011. The Liberal Democrats did not contest Ash South & Tongham or Ash Vale. Labour did not contest Ash Vale or Pirbright. A total of 9 candidates from the Peace Party contested wards in the west part of Guildford town. 5 wards were contested by UKIP candidates. 1 ward, Onslow, was contested by the Green Party. There was also one independent candidate, who stood in Normandy.

=== 2015 ===
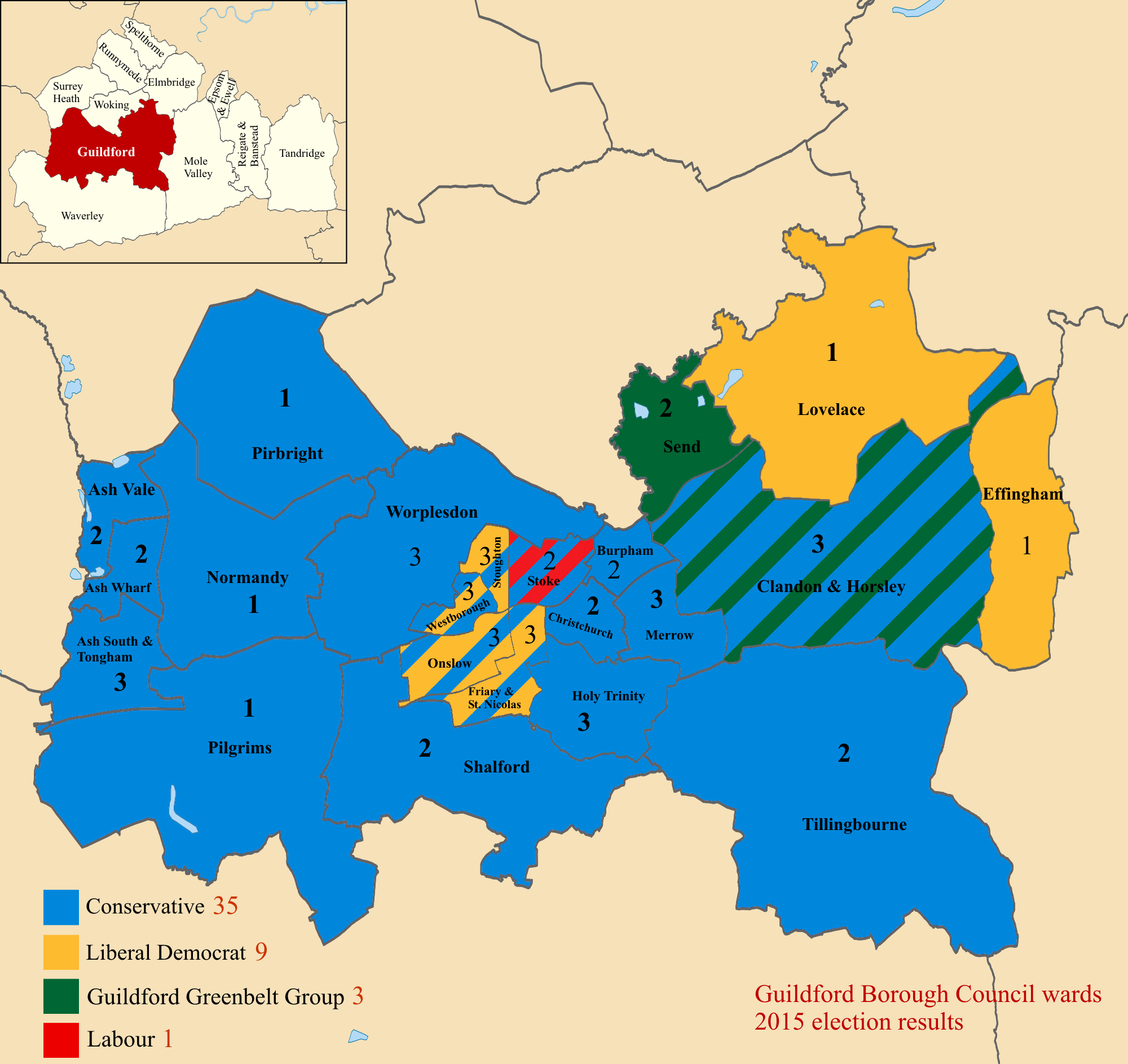
2015 election Guildford Borough Council

2015 Election
Party	Seats
Conservative	35
Labour	1
Liberal Democrats	9
Guildford Greenbelt	3
Independent	0

Number of councillors per ward is shown in brackets after the ward name.

Wards won by the Conservatives – Ash South & Tongham (3); Ash Vale (2); Ash Wharf (2); Burpham (2); Christchurch (2); Holy Trinity (3); Merrow (3); Normandy (1); Pilgrims (1); Pirbright (1); Shalford (2); Tillingbourne (2); Worplesdon (3)

Wards won by Liberal Democrats – Effingham (1); Lovelace (1)

Wards won by Guildford Greenbelt Group - Send (2)

Wards electing councillors of more than one party – Clandon & Horsley (3 – 2 Con, 1 Guildford Greenbelt); Friary and St Nicolas (3 – 1 Con, 2 LibD); Onslow (3 – 1 Con, 2 LibD); Stoke (2 – 1 Con, 1 Lab); Stoughton (3 – 1 Con, 2 LibD), Westborough (3 – 2 Con, 1 LibD)

The 2015 council elections coincided with the United Kingdom general election.

The results saw the Conservatives retain control of Guildford Borough Council, narrowly increasing their majority.

The Guildford Greenbelt Group won 3 seats on the council, all in rural wards towards the north east and east of the borough.

The Conservatives gained a seat in Stoke ward and 2 seats in Westborough ward, the first time that they had won seats in either of these wards since the creation of Guildford Borough Council in the early 1970s.

The Conservatives and the Liberal Democrats were the only parties which contested all the wards in Guildford in the 2015 local elections.

=== 2019 ===
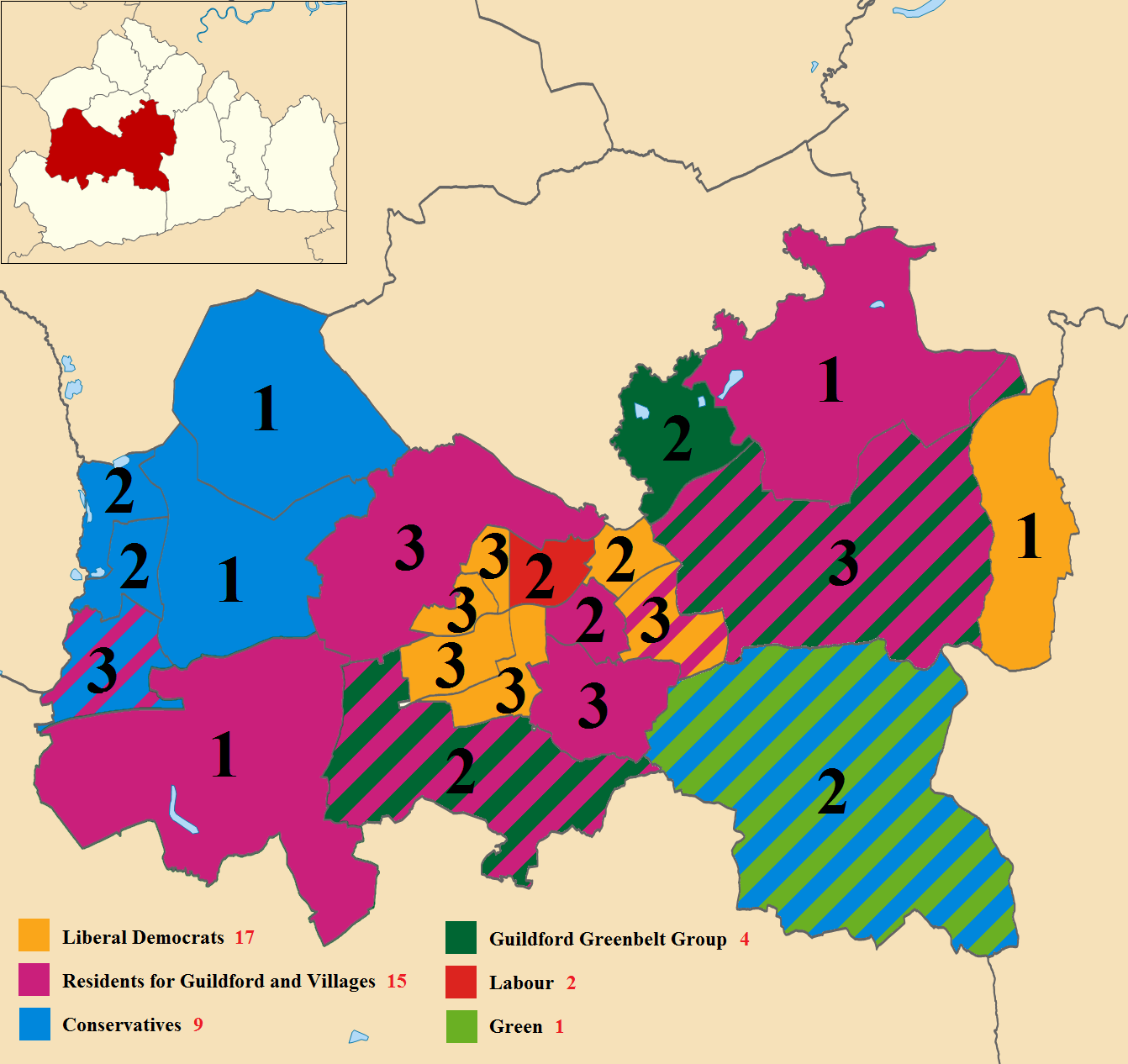
2019 election Guildford Borough Council

2019 Election
Party	Seats
Liberal Democrats	17
R4GV	15
Conservative	9
GGG	4
Labour	2
Green	1

Number of councillors per ward is shown in brackets after the ward name.

Wards won solely by the Liberal Democrats – Burpham (2); Friary & St Nicolas (3); Effingham (1); Onslow (3); Stoughton (3); Westborough (3)

Wards won solely by Residents for Guildford and Villages (R4GV) – Christchurch (2); Holy Trinity (3); Lovelace (1); Pilgrims (1); Worplesdon (3)

Wards won solely by the Conservatives – Ash Vale (2); Ash Wharf (2); Pirbright (1); Normandy (1)

Wards won solely by Guildford Greenbelt Group – Send (2)

Wards won solely by Labour – Stoke (2)

Wards electing councillors of more than one party – Ash South & Tongham (3 – 2 Con, 1 R4GV); Clandon & Horsley (3 – 2 R4GV, 1 Guildford Greenbelt); Merrow (3 - 1 R4GV, 2 Lib Dem); Shalford (2 - 1 R4GV, 1 Guildford Greenbelt), Tillingbourne (2 - 1 Con, 1 Green)

The results saw the Conservatives lose control of Guildford Borough Council, falling from 31 seats to 9, making the Liberal Democrats the largest party on 17 seats.

Prior to the election, 3 councillors had defected from the Conservatives and 1 had defected from the Liberal Democrats to form the Independent Alliance on the council. The Independent Alliance registered Residents for Guildford and Villages as a political party to contest the 2019 elections and proceeded to win 15 seats.

The Guildford Greenbelt Group increased their representation to 4 seats whilst Labour maintained a by-election gain from the Conservatives to emerge with 2 seats.

The Green party also won their first seat on Guildford Borough Council in Tillingbourne ward. Following the election the Green councillor chose to sit on the council as part of the R4GV group.

After taking office, on 15 May 2019 councillors voted by 23 to 19 to elect the Liberal Democrat group leader, Caroline Reeves, as Leader of Guildford Borough Council over the leader of the R4GV group, Joss Bigmore. On 20 May 2019 Caroline Reeves announced that (including herself) the council's Cabinet would consist of 8 Liberal Democrats, 1 R4GV and 1 GGG councillor with an additional R4GV councillor attending cabinet as a non-voting deputy. This was the first Liberal Democrat-led administration of Guildford Borough Council since 2003. In October 2020, Caroline Reeves handed the leadership to the R4GV party leader, Joss Bigmore, as part of a power sharing agreement. This was the first independent-led administration in Guildford Borough Council's history. Lib Dem group leader Julia McShane regained the council leadership back in October 2022, giving each party 2 years in control.

== By-election results ==
=== 1995–1999 ===
Worplesdon By-Election 20 February 1997
Party	Candidate	Votes	%	±%
Liberal Democrats	Terry King	1,066	46.0	
Conservative	Dave Elms	1,001	43.2	
Labour	Alan Ritchie	249	10.8	
Majority		65	2.8	
Turnout		2,316	37.4	
Liberal Democrats hold		Swing		

Merrow & Burpham By-Election 1 May 1997
Party	Candidate	Votes	%	±%
Conservative	Nick Brougham	3,395	44.9	+11.5
Liberal Democrats	Edward Mayne	3,171	41.9	−11.1
Labour		1,003	13.3	−0.3
Majority		224	3.0	
Turnout		7,572		
Conservative gain from Liberal Democrats		Swing	11.3	

=== 1999–2003 ===
Ash By-Election 18 January 2001
Party	Candidate	Votes	%	±%
Conservative	Nigel Manning	1,027	58.1	+5.0
Liberal Democrats	Denise Smith	740	41.9	+5.8
Majority		287	16.2	
Turnout		1,767	23.1	
Conservative hold		Swing	-0.4	

=== 2003–2007 ===
Merrow By-Election 24 July 2003
Party	Candidate	Votes	%	±%
Liberal Democrats	Merilyn Spier	1,107	47.0	+4.2
Conservative	David Carpenter	1,082	46.0	−1.2
Labour	Michael Hassell	117	5.0	−5.1
Independent	Beverley Thomas	48	2.0	+2.0
Majority		25	1.0	
Turnout		2,354	40.2	
Liberal Democrats gain from Conservative		Swing	2.7	

Friary and St Nicolas By-Election 25 March 2004
Party	Candidate	Votes	%	±%
Liberal Democrats	Rupert Sheard	1,419	53.1	−5.9
Conservative	Marc Clancy	929	34.8	+12.9
Labour	James Heaphy	158	5.9	−5.6
Independent	Raschid Abdullah	85	3.2	+3.2
Peace	John Morris	81	3.0	+3.0
Majority		490	18.3	
Turnout		2,672	44.7	
Liberal Democrats hold		Swing	-9.4	

Friary and St Nicolas By-Election 24 November 2005
Party	Candidate	Votes	%	±%
Liberal Democrats	Caroline Reeves	1,123	61.0	+7.9
Conservative	Katherine Lyons	602	32.7	−2.1
Labour	Susan Gomm	74	4.0	−1.9
Independent	Thomas May	43	2.3	−0.9
Majority		521	28.3	
Turnout		1,799	29.3	−15.4
Liberal Democrats hold		Swing	5	

Ash South and Tongham By-Election 28 July 2006
Party	Candidate	Votes	%	±%
Conservative	Douglas Richards	1,245	64.5	+8.2
Liberal Democrats	Denise Smith	684	35.5	+1.0
Majority		561	29.0	
Turnout		1,929	32.8	
Conservative hold		Swing	3.6	

=== 2007–2011 ===
Holy Trinity By-Election 8 November 2007
Party	Candidate	Votes	%	±%
Conservative	Melanie Bright	1110	50.9	+3.9
Liberal Democrats	Vivienne Johnson	944	43.3	−5.9
Labour	Martin Phillips	83	3.8	+0.0
Peace	John Morris	43	2.0	+2.0
Majority		166	7.6	
Turnout		2181	37.0	
Conservative gain from Liberal Democrats		Swing	4.9	

Stoke By-Election 11 September 2008
Party	Candidate	Votes	%	±%
Liberal Democrats	Zöe Franklin	864	56.0	+3.0
Conservative	Philip Hooper	410	26.6	+7.6
Labour	Michael Hassell	211	13.7	−14.4
UKIP	Mazhar Manzoor	59	3.8	+3.8
Majority		454	29.3	
Turnout		2,181	37.0	
Liberal Democrats hold		Swing	8.7	

Pirbright By-election 15 July 2010
Party	Candidate	Votes	%	±%
Conservative	Gordon Ackroyd Jackson	364	64.3	−1.7
Liberal Democrats	Philip Nicolas Douetil	199	35.2	1.6
Majority		165	29.2	
Turnout		566		
Conservative hold		Swing	-1.6	

=== 2011–2015 ===
Ash South & Tongham By-election 2 May 2013
Party	Candidate	Votes	%	±%
Conservative	Paul Michael Spooner	unopposed		
Conservative hold		Swing		

Ash Wharf By-election 2 May 2013
Party	Candidate	Votes	%	±%
Conservative	Murray Grubb	687	50.3	
Liberal Democrats	Alan Richard Hilliar	420	30.7	
Labour	Joan Anne May O'Byrne	225	16.5	
Majority		267	19.5	
Turnout		1367		
Conservative hold		Swing		

Stoughton By-election 2 May 2013
Party	Candidate	Votes	%	±%
Liberal Democrats	Elizabeth Griffiths	999	47.3	
Conservative	Sharon Denise Stokes	768	36.3	
Labour	William Cooper	312	14.8	
Majority		231	10.9	
Turnout		2114		
Liberal Democrats hold		Swing		

Lovelace By-election 25 September 2014
Party	Candidate	Votes	%	±%
Liberal Democrats	Colin George Cross	555	63.2	
Conservative	George Benjamin Paton	225	25.6	
UKIP	David Sheppard	63	7.2	
Labour	Robin Clifford Woof	32	3.6	
Majority		330	37.6	
Turnout		878		
Liberal Democrats gain from Conservative		Swing		

=== 2015–2019 ===
Ash South & Tongham By-election 3 December 2015
Party	Candidate	Votes	%	±%
Conservative	Andrew Francis Henry Gomm	540	43.2	
Liberal Democrats	Alan Hilliar	286	22.9	
UKIP	Kyle Greaves	153	12.2	
Guildford Greenbelt Group	Ramsey Nagaty	145	11.6	
Labour	George Dokimakis	125	10.0	
Majority		254	20.3	
Turnout		1250	20.8	
Conservative hold		Swing		

Stoke By-election 5 May 2016
Party	Candidate	Votes	%	±%
Labour	James Walsh	528	34.5	+6.7
Conservative	Barry Keane	497	32.4	+1.9
Liberal Democrats	Hannah Thompson	492	32.1	+8.0
Majority		31	2.1	
Turnout		1532	27.5	
Labour gain from Conservative		Swing		

=== 2019–2023 ===
Friary and St Nicolas By-election 6 May 2021
Party	Candidate	Votes	%	±%
Liberal Democrats	Cait Taylor	1,056	38.9	
R4GV	Dom Frazer	660	24.3	
Conservative	Sallie Anne Barker	548	20.2	
Labour Co-op	Jacob Darby Allen	430	15.9	
Majority		396	14.6	
Turnout		2712	39.6	
Liberal Democrats hold		Swing		

Pirbright By-election 6 May 2021
Party	Candidate	Votes	%	±%
Conservative	Keith Francis Witham	440	60.2	
Green	Claire Whitehouse	119	16.3	
R4GV	Gerry Lytle	109	14.9	
Labour	Ali Mirmak	56	7.7	
Majority		321	43.9	
Turnout		731	34.5	
Conservative hold		Swing		

Send By-election 6 May 2021
Party	Candidate	Votes	%	±%
GGG	Guida Esteves	851	52.0	
Conservative	Justin Phillip Andrew Offord	500	30.6	
Green	Sam Elliot Cordero Peters	206	12.6	
Labour	Charlotte Ann Smith	68	4.2	
Majority		351	21.5	
Turnout		1635	47.9	
GGG hold		Swing		

Tillingbourne By-election 20 October 2022
Party	Candidate	Votes	%	±%
Liberal Democrats	Richard Morris	636	46.5	
Conservative	Justin Offord	293	21.4	
R4GV	Clare Price	185	13.5	
Green	Sam Peters	168	12.3	
Labour	John Marsh	85	6.2	
Majority		343	25	
Turnout		1370	31	
Liberal Democrats gain from Conservative		Swing		

=== 2023–2027 ===
Onslow By-election 7 May 2026
Party	Candidate	Votes	%	±%
Liberal Democrats	James Steel	1,145	49.4	
Green	Claire Whitehouse	563	24.3	
Conservative	André Hester	281	12.1	
Reform	Adam Farkas	242	10.4	
Labour	Hannah Rich	86	3.7	
Majority		582	25.1	
Turnout		2,317		
Liberal Democrats hold		Swing		

== Surrey County Council electoral divisions in Guildford ==
Guildford is located in the county of Surrey. The number of seats (or electoral divisions) on Surrey County Council was increased from 76 to 80, in time for the 2005 election. This resulted in an increase of one in the number of those seats located in the borough of Guildford; from 9 to 10 seats. A summary of the number of seats won by each political party, within the borough of Guildford, is shown below for the County Council elections from 1965 onwards.

=== Seats changing hands in 1965 ===
The Conservatives gained the electoral division of Guildford East from an independent. Labour gained the electoral divisions of Guildford North and Guildford West from the Conservatives.

The Conservatives won Ash, Guildford East, Guildford South, Horsleys, Shalford, Shere and Worplesdon. Labour won Guildford North and Guildford West.

1965 Election
Party	Seats
Conservative	7
Labour	2
Liberal	0

=== Seats changing hands in 1967 ===
The Conservatives gained the electoral divisions of Guildford North and Guildford West from Labour.

The Conservatives consequently won all nine of the electoral divisions in Guildford namely Ash, Guildford East, Guildford North, Guildford South, Guildford West, Horsleys, Shalford, Shere and Worplesdon.

1967 Election
Party	Seats
Conservative	9
Labour	0
Liberal	0

=== Seats changing hands in 1970 ===
Labour gained the electoral division of Guildford West from the Conservatives.

The Conservatives won Ash, Guildford East, Guildford North, Guildford South, Horsleys, Shalford, Shere and Worplesdon. Labour won Guildford West.

1970 Election
Party	Seats
Conservative	8
Labour	1
Liberal	0

=== Seats changing hands in 1973 ===
Labour gained the electoral division of Guildford North from the Conservatives. The Liberals gained the electoral division of Guildford South from the Conservatives.

The Conservatives won Ash, Guildford East, Horsleys, Shalford, Shere and Worplesdon. Labour won Guildford North and Guildford West. The Liberals won Guildford South.

1973 Election
Party	Seats
Conservative	6
Labour	2
Liberal	1

=== Seats changing hands in 1977 ===
The Conservatives gained the electoral divisions of Guildford North and Guildford West from Labour, and gained the electoral division of Guildford South from the Liberals.

The Conservatives consequently won all nine of the electoral divisions in Guildford namely Ash, Guildford East, Guildford North, Guildford South, Guildford West, Horsleys, Shalford, Shere and Worplesdon.

1977 Election
Party	Seats
Conservative	9
Labour	0
Liberal	0

=== Seats changing hands in 1981 ===
Labour gained the electoral divisions of Guildford North and Guildford West from the Conservatives.

The Conservatives won Ash, Guildford East, Guildford South, Horsleys, Shalford, Shere and Worplesdon. Labour won Guildford North and Guildford West.

1981 Election
Party	Seats
Conservative	7
Labour	2
Liberal	0

=== Seats changing hands in 1985 ===
The SDP-Liberal Alliance gained the electoral division of Guildford South from the Conservatives. The SDP-Liberal Alliance retained the electoral division of Worplesdon which they had gained from the Conservatives in a by-election, in November 1984.

The Conservatives won Ash, Guildford East, Horsleys, Shalford and Shere. The SDP-Liberal Alliance won Guildford South and Worplesdon. Labour won Guildford North and Guildford West.

1985 Election
Party	Seats
Conservative	5
Labour	2
SDP-Liberal Alliance	2

=== Seats changing hands in 1989 ===
The Conservatives gained the electoral division of Worplesdon from the Social and Liberal Democrats.

The Conservatives won Ash, Guildford East, Horsleys, Shalford, Shere and Worplesdon. The Social and Liberal Democrats won Guildford South. Labour won Guildford North and Guildford West.

1989 Election
Party	Seats
Conservative	6
Labour	2
Social & Liberal Democrats	1

=== Seats changing hands in 1993 ===
The Liberal Democrats gained the electoral division of Guildford North from Labour and the electoral division of Worplesdon from the Conservatives. The Liberal Democrats retained the electoral division of Ash which they had gained from the Conservatives in a by-election, in 1990.

The Conservatives won Guildford East, Horsleys, Shalford, and Shere. The Liberal Democrats won Ash, Guildford North, Guildford South and Worplesdon. Labour won Guildford West.

1993 Election
Party	Seats
Conservative	4
Labour	1
Liberal Democrats	4

=== Seats changing hands in 1997 ===
The Conservatives gained the electoral division of Ash from the Liberal Democrats.

The Conservatives won Ash, Guildford East, Horsleys, Shalford, and Shere. The Liberal Democrats won Guildford North, Guildford South and Worplesdon. Labour won Guildford West.

1997 Election
Party	Seats
Conservative	5
Labour	1
Liberal Democrats	3

=== Seats changing hands in 2001 ===
None – all seats were retained by the party which held that seat going into the election.

The Conservatives retained Ash, Guildford East, Horsleys, Shalford, and Shere. The Liberal Democrats retained Guildford North, Guildford South and Worplesdon. Labour retained Guildford West.

2001 Election
Party	Seats
Conservative	5
Labour	1
Liberal Democrats	3

=== Seats changing hands in 2005 ===
The Liberal Democrats gained the electoral division of Guildford West from Labour and the electoral division Guildford East from the Conservatives. The Conservatives gained the electoral division of Worplesdon from the Liberal Democrats.

In the 2005 election, the number of County Council electoral divisions in the borough of Guildford was increased from 9 to 10. This saw the disappearance of the division known as Guildford South and the creation of two new electoral divisions known as Guildford South East and Guildford South West. The Liberal Democrats, who prior to this election had held the old division of Guildford South, won both of the new divisions Guildford South East and Guildford South West.

The Conservatives won Ash, Horsleys, Shalford, Shere and Worplesdon. The Liberal Democrats won Guildford East, Guildford North, Guildford South East, Guildford South West and Guildford West.

2005 Election
Party	Seats
Conservative	5
Labour	0
Liberal Democrats	5

Ash By-Election 28 July 2006
Party	Candidate	Votes	%	±%
Conservative	Marsha Moseley	1,547	63.3	+12.2
Liberal Democrats	Denise Smith	898	36.7	+3.5
Majority		649	26.6	
Turnout		2,445	27.7	
Conservative hold		Swing	4.4	

=== Seats changing hands in 2009 ===
The Conservatives gained two electoral divisions, Guildford East and Guildford South East, from the Liberal Democrats.

The Conservatives won Ash, Guildford East, Guildford South East, Horsleys, Shalford, Shere and Worplesdon. The Liberal Democrats won Guildford North, Guildford South West and Guildford West.

2009 Election
Party	Seats
Conservative	7
Liberal Democrats	3

Worplesdon By-Election 15 July 2010
Party	Candidate	Votes	%	±%
Conservative	Nigel Sutcliffe	1844	53.5	5.3
Liberal Democrats	Paul Ronald Cragg	1286	37.3	2.4
Labour	Martin Phillips	193	5.6	1.5
UKIP	Mazhar Manzoor	78	2.3	−9.8
Peace	John Hugh Morris	39	1.1	1.1
Majority		558	16.2	
Turnout		3448		
Conservative hold		Swing	1.4	

Shalford By-Election 5 May 2011
Party	Candidate	Votes	%	±%
Conservative	Simon George Stanford Gimson	3602	66.1	8.4
Liberal Democrats	Andrew Howard Barnes	1087	20.0	−2.4
Labour	Michael Stanley Jeram	701	12.9	7.8
Majority		2515	46.2	
Turnout		5446		
Conservative hold		Swing	5.4	

Worplesdon By-Election 3 May 2012
Party	Candidate	Votes	%	±%
Conservative	Keith Francis Witham	2022	53.3	
Liberal Democrats	Paul Ronald Cragg	1236	32.6	
Labour	Martin Phillips	517	13.6	
Majority		786	20.7	
Turnout		3794		
Conservative hold		Swing		

=== Seats changing hands in 2013 ===
The Conservatives did not contest the electoral division of Shalford as they failed to submit candidate nomination papers by the deadline. The United Kingdom Independence Party gained the electoral division of Shalford from the Conservatives.

The Conservatives retained Ash, Guildford East, Guildford South East, Horsleys, Shere and Worplesdon. The Liberal Democrats retained Guildford North, Guildford South West and Guildford West. UKIP won Shalford.

2013 Election
Party	Seats
Conservative	6
Liberal Democrats	3
UKIP	1

=== Seats changing hands in 2017 ===
The Conservatives regained the electoral division of Shalford from the United Kingdom Independence Party. No other seats changed hands in the Guildford area in the 2017 Surrey County Council elections.

The Conservatives retained Ash, Guildford East, Guildford South East, Horsleys, Shere and Worplesdon; and they gained Shalford. The Liberal Democrats retained Guildford North, Guildford South West and Guildford West.

2017 Election
Party	Seats
Conservative	7
Liberal Democrats	3
UKIP	0

=== Seats changing hands in 2021 ===
In the 2021 Surrey County Council election the Liberal Democrats gained the electoral divisions of Ash and Guildford East from the Conservatives who also lost the electoral divisions of Guildford South East and Horsleys to Residents for Guildford and Villages (R4GV). The election saw an agreement between the Green Party and the Liberal Democrats where they did not stand against each other, resulting in the Green Party standing a candidate in the Shere division only, while the Liberal Democrats contested only the other nine divisions within Guildford borough.

The Conservatives Shalford, Shere and Worplesdon. The Liberal Democrats retained Guildford North, Guildford South West and Guildford West; they gained Ash and Guildford East. R4GV, standing in the county council elections for the first time, gained Guildford South East and Horsleys.

2021 Election
Party	Seats
Liberal Democrats	5
Conservative	3
Residents for Guildford and Villages	2

Horsleys By-Election 20 October 2023
Party	Candidate	Votes	%	±%
R4GV	Dennis Booth	1,095	39.3	
Liberal Democrats	Paul Kennedy	1,023	36.7	
Conservative	Alexander Stewart-Clark	569	20.4	
Labour	John Barnes	99	3.6	
Majority		72		
Turnout			28.25	
R4GV hold		Swing		
