= Surrey County Council elections =

Local government elections in Surrey, England

Surrey County Council was elected every four years and was formed in 1889 under the Local Government Act 1888. Since 1965 this council has had one of two statuses as to its body of councillors: no overall political control, or overall Conservative party control. The council is due to be abolished on 1 April 2027, following the creation of East Surrey Council and West Surrey Council

== Political context ==
Its area was significantly altered in 1965, taking much of its north into Greater London and adding an area forming one present district from Middlesex which was dissolved. To accommodate this, councillors elected in 1961 had their three year-term extended for an extra year and the April 1964 election took place in 1965.

Since 1974 all Surrey areas have had district/borough councils providing a second tier of services (see the Local Government Act 1972) replacing Urban Districts and Rural Districts.

Approximately a third of the population elect a further more localised third tier of local government to civil parishes such as Farnham, Claygate and Horley.

Major services provided include social services, minerals strategy and permissions, waste planning and substantial elements of transport (excluding railways) and education. The county has no grammar schools (which tend to have less local authority control) however academies and free schools in the 21st century have been set up in Surrey meaning a lower proportion of schools are run by the authority than in the 20th century.

== Council composition ==
Composition of the council
Year	Conservative	Liberal Democrats (Note: Includes totals for the predecessors of the Liberal Democrats, the Liberal Party and SDP (both of which participated in the Alliance).)	Labour	Green	UKIP	Independents & Others	Council control after election
1965	57	1	8	–	–	6	Conservative
1967	64	0	3	–	–	5	Conservative
1970	64	1	4	–	–	3	Conservative
Local government reorganisation (72 seats)
1973	46	9	12	–	–	5	Conservative
1977	68	0	2	0	–	3	Conservative
New division boundaries (76 seats)
1981	61	3	7	0	–	5	Conservative
1985	52	12	7	0	–	5	Conservative
1989	56	9	7	0	–	4	Conservative
1993	34	29	8	0	–	5	No overall control
1997	47	17	6	0	0	6	Conservative
2001	51	13	6	0	0	6	Conservative
New division boundaries (80 seats)
2005	58	12	2	0	0	8	Conservative
2009	56	13	1	0	0	10	Conservative
New division boundaries (81 seats)
2013	58	9	1	1	3	9	Conservative
2017	61	9	1	1	0	9	Conservative
2021	47	14	2	2	0	16 (Note: Including 10 Residents Association, 2 R4GV)	Conservative

== County result maps ==
2005 results map

2009 results map

2013 results map

2017 results map

2021 results map

== By-election results ==
=== 1997–2001 ===
Dorking Rural By-Election 7 May 1998
Party	Candidate	Votes	%	±%
Conservative		1,930	55.3	+4.7
Liberal Democrats		1,245	35.7	−1.8
Labour		312	8.9	−3.0
Majority		685	19.6	
Turnout		3,487		
Conservative hold		Swing	3.2	

Addlestone By-Election 6 May 1999
Party	Candidate	Votes	%	±%
Conservative		2,428	59.1	+9.3
Labour		1,678	40.9	+7.6
Majority		750	18.2	
Turnout		4,106	32.3	
Conservative hold		Swing	0.8	

Waverley West By-Election 28 October 1999
Party	Candidate	Votes	%	±%
Conservative		1,904	52.1	+8.9
Liberal Democrats		1,629	44.5	−6.1
Labour		123	3.4	−2.8
Majority		278	7.6	
Turnout		3,659	31.9	
Conservative gain from Liberal Democrats		Swing	7.5	

Epsom and Ewell By-Election 18 November 1999
Party	Candidate	Votes	%	±%
Independent		847	38.5	−31.5
Conservative		736	33.7	+33.7
Liberal Democrats		472	21.6	−8.1
Labour		129	5.9	+5.9
Majority		111	4.8	
Turnout		2,184	18.9	
Independent hold		Swing	-32.6	

=== 2001–2005 ===
Stanwell By-Election 20 November 2003
Party	Candidate	Votes	%	±%
Labour		741	40.1	−9.9
Conservative		729	39.4	+3.8
Liberal Democrats		282	15.2	+6.5
Independent		98	5.3	−0.3
Majority		12	0.7	
Turnout		1,850	22.5	
Labour hold		Swing	-6.8	

Woking West By-Election 4 March 2004
Party	Candidate	Votes	%	±%
Liberal Democrats		1,672	57.2	+9.3
Conservative		1,022	34.9	+4.0
Labour		231	7.9	−13.3
Majority		650	22.3	
Turnout		2,925	18.0	
Liberal Democrats hold		Swing	+2.6	

=== 2005–2009 ===
Godalming South Milford & Witley By-Election 15 September 2005
Party	Candidate	Votes	%	±%
Conservative		2,042	49.4	+0.1
Liberal Democrats		1,974	47.8	+6.7
Labour		115	2.8	−6.7
Majority		68	1.6	
Turnout		4,131	39.6	
Conservative hold		Swing	-3.3	

Ash By-Election 28 July 2006
Party	Candidate	Votes	%	±%
Conservative	Marsha Moseley	1,547	63.3	+12.2
Liberal Democrats	Denise Smith	898	36.7	+3.5
Majority		649	26.6	
Turnout		2,445	27.7	
Conservative hold		Swing	+4.3	

Englefield Green By-Election 23 November 2006
Party	Candidate	Votes	%	±%
Conservative	Marisa Heath	664	45.9	−3.1
Liberal Democrats		317	21.9	−1.5
UKIP		281	19.4	+13.8
Labour		150	10.4	−9.2
Monster Raving Loony		34	2.4	+2.4
Majority		347	24.0	
Turnout		1,446		
Conservative hold		Swing		

=== 2009–2013 ===
Walton South & Oatlands By-Election 6 May 2010
Party	Candidate	Votes	%	±%
Conservative	Anthony Samuels	5231	65.1	−0.2
Liberal Democrats	Vicki Macleod	2802	34.9	+9.3
Majority		2429	30.2	
Turnout		8,033	69.4	+29.7
Conservative hold		Swing	-4.8	

Worplesdon 15 July 2010
Party	Candidate	Votes	%	±%
Conservative	Nigel Sutcliffe	1,844	53.5	+5.3
Liberal Democrats	Paul Ronald Cragg	1,286	37.3	+2.4
Labour	Martin Phillips	193	5.6	+1.5
UKIP	Mazhar Manzoor	78	2.3	−9.8
Peace	John Hugh Morris	39	1.1	+1.1
Majority		558	16.2	
Turnout		3,448		
Conservative hold		Swing	+1.4	

Cranleigh and Ewhurst By-Election 5 May 2011
Party	Candidate	Votes	%	±%
Conservative	Alan Young	2,830	52.5	−6.1
Independent	Diane James	1,093	20.3	+20.3
Liberal Democrats	Richard Cole	933	17.3	−19.0
Labour	Lynda MacDermott	532	9.9	+4.9
Majority		1,737	32.2	
Turnout		5,388		
Conservative hold		Swing		

Shalford By-Election 5 May 2011
Party	Candidate	Votes	%	±%
Conservative	Simon Gimson	3,602	66.1	+8.4
Liberal Democrats	Andrew Barnes	1,087	20.0	−2.4
Labour	Michael Jeram	701	12.9	+7.8
Majority		2,515	46.2	
Turnout		5,446		
Conservative hold		Swing	+5.4	

St Johns and Brookwood By-Election 19 May 2011
Party	Candidate	Votes	%	±%
Conservative	Linda Kemeny	1,342	48.9	+5.9
Liberal Democrats	Christina Judith Liddington	1058	38.6	−2.8
Labour	Audrey Janice Worgan	188	6.9	+3.1
UKIP	Duncan Clarke	155	5.6	−6.2
Majority		284	10.3	
Turnout		2,749		
Conservative hold		Swing		

Worplesdon By-Election 3 May 2012
Party	Candidate	Votes	%	±%
Conservative	Keith Witham	2,022	53.6	+0.0
Liberal Democrats	Paul Ronald Cragg	1236	32.7	−4.7
Labour	Martin Phillips	517	13.7	+8.1
Majority		786	20.8	
Turnout		3,794		
Conservative hold		Swing		

=== 2013–2017 ===
Weybridge By-Election 7 May 2015
Party	Candidate	Votes	%	±%
Conservative	Ramon Gray	4,190	54.6	+22.8
Weybridge Independents	Peter Harman	1,899	24.7	−0.7
Labour	Elinor Jones	967	12.6	+7.5
UKIP	Joe Branco	622	8.1	−8.7
Majority		2,291	29.8	
Turnout		7,678		
Conservative hold		Swing		

Epsom West By-Election 19 November 2015
Party	Candidate	Votes	%	±%
Conservative	Karan Persand	612	23.6	+10.8
Residents Association	Neil Dallen	591	22.8	+0.0
Liberal Democrats	Julie Morris	588	22.7	−5.3
Labour	Kate Chinn	578	22.3	+2.1
UKIP	Robert Leach	168	6.5	−9.7
Green	Chris Crook	58	2.2	+2.2
Majority		21	0.8	
Turnout		2,602	24.7	
Conservative gain from Liberal Democrats		Swing		

Staines South and Ashford West By-Election 5 May 2016
Party	Candidate	Votes	%	±%
Conservative	Denise Turner-Stewart	1,585	46.6	+9.0
UKIP	Peter Appleford	695	20.4	−17.4
Labour	Iain Raymond	543	16.0	−4.3
Liberal Democrats	Christopher Bateson	382	11.2	+7.4
Green	Andrew McLuskey	145	4.3	+4.3
TUSC	Matthew David Clarke	33	1.0	+1.0
Majority		890	26.1	
Turnout		3,404		
Conservative gain from UKIP		Swing		

Farnham South By-Election 18 August 2016
Party	Candidate	Votes	%	±%
Conservative	Robert Ramsdale	932	41.2	−9.0
Farnham Residents	Jerry Hyman	754	33.4	+33.4
Liberal Democrats	Joanne Aylwin	269	11.9	+11.9
Independent	Mark Westcott	139	6.1	−10.0
UKIP	Paul John Chapman	89	3.9	−12.3
Labour	Fabian Benjamin Wood	77	3.4	−3.6
Majority		178	7.9	
Turnout		2,267	22.8	
Conservative hold		Swing		

=== 2017–2021 ===
The Byfleets By-Election 6 December 2018
Party	Candidate	Votes	%	±%
Independent	Amanda Boote	1,128	48.6	+48.6
Conservative	Gary Elson	782	33.7	−7.7
Liberal Democrats	Ellen Nicholson	309	13.3	−4.2
UKIP	Lyn Sage	101	4.4	+1.1
Majority		346	14.9	
Turnout		2,320	23	
Independent gain from Conservative		Swing		

Warlingham By-Election 31 January 2019
Party	Candidate	Votes	%	±%
Conservative	Becky Rush	1,199	48.1	−8.2
Liberal Democrats	Charles Lister	990	39.7	+10.8
UKIP	Haley Martin Arthur	176	7.1	−2.9
Labour	Michael Snowden	126	5.1	+0.3
Majority		209	8.4	
Turnout		2,491	25	
Conservative hold		Swing		

Haselmere By-Election 2 May 2019
Party	Candidate	Votes	%	±%
Independent	Nikki Barton	2,665	65.2	+65.2
Conservative	Malcolm Carter	1159	28.4	−22.9
Labour	Adrian la Porta	263	6.4	−1.9
Majority		1,506	36.8	
Turnout		4,087	43	
Independent gain from Conservative		Swing		

=== 2021–2027 ===
Sunbury Common and Ashford Common By-Election 30 November 2022
Party	Candidate	Votes	%	±%
Liberal Democrats	Harry Boparai	735	35.9	+17.1
Conservative	Naz Islam	720	35.1	−11.4
Labour	Khalid Mustafa	383	18.7	+2.6
Reform	Rory O'Brien	144	7.0	+2.5
Majority		15	0.7	
Turnout		2,053	17	
Liberal Democrats gain from Conservative		Swing	14.3	

Horsleys By-Election 19 October 2023
Party	Candidate	Votes	%	±%
R4GV	Dennis Booth	1,095	39.3	−8.5
Liberal Democrats	Paul Kennedy	1,023	36.7	+25.1
Conservative	Alexander Stewart-Clark	569	20.4	−17.0
Labour	John Barnes	99	3.6	+0.4
Majority		72	2.6	
Turnout		2,786		
R4GV hold		Swing		

Nork and Tattenhams By-Election 1 May 2025
Party	Candidate	Votes	%	±%
Nork and Tattenhams Residents' Associations	Peter Harp	2,084	53.9	−9.9
Reform	Elizabeth Cooper	902	23.3	+23.3
Conservative	Pamela Freeman	515	13.3	−7.7
Labour	Esme Wright	167	4.3	−2.7
Liberal Democrats	Mike Robinson	106	2.7	−1.0
Green	Alistair Morten	93	2.4	−2.1
Majority		1,182	30.6	
Turnout		3,867		
Nork and Tattenhams Residents' Associations hold		Swing		

Woking South By-Election 10 July 2025
Party	Candidate	Votes	%	±%
Liberal Democrats	Louise Morales	1,939	63.8	+5.8
Reform	Richard Barker	584	19.2	+19.2
Conservative	Martin Benstead	291	9.6	−16.4
Green	Paul Hoekstra	134	4.4	−2.6
Labour	Sean O'Malley	91	3	−5
Majority		1,355	44.6	
Turnout		3,039		
Liberal Democrats hold		Swing		

Addlestone By-Election 21 August 2025
Party	Candidate	Votes	%	±%
Reform	Scott Kelly	931	34.2	+34.2
Conservative	Shannon Saise-Marshall	659	24.2	−25.9
Liberal Democrats	Michael Smith	473	17.4	+9.3
Green	Steven Ringham	441	16.2	+2.0
Labour Co-op	Arran Neathey	222	8.1	−10.9
Majority		272	10.0	
Turnout		2,738		
Reform gain from Conservative				

Hinchley Wood, Claygate and Oxshott By-Election 21 August 2025
Party	Candidate	Votes	%	±%
Liberal Democrats	Andy Burton	1,656	38.1	−6.2
Conservative	Andrew Burley	1,346	31.0	−15.9
Independent	Mary Marshall	659	15.2	+15.2
Reform	Nicholas Wood	551	12.7	+8.3
Green	Sarah Coomes	101	2.3	+2.3
Labour	Irene Threlkeld	31	0.7	−3.6
Majority		310	7.1	
Turnout		4,344		
Liberal Democrats gain from Conservative		Swing		

Camberley West By-Election 16 October 2025
Party	Candidate	Votes	%	±%
Liberal Democrats	Alan Ashbury	1,617	49.5	+16.6
Reform	Darryl Ratiram	845	25.8	+25.8
Conservative	Attieh Ford	666	20.4	−28.8
Labour	Simon Schofield	140	4.3	−11.4
Majority		772	23.7	
Turnout		3,268		
Liberal Democrats gain from Conservative		Swing		

Caterham Valley By-Election 16 October 2025
Party	Candidate	Votes	%	±%
Liberal Democrats	Tony Pearce	1,182	48.1	+0.6
Reform	Jacqueline Thomson	601	24.5	+24.5
Conservative	Richard Mark	320	13.0	−23.6
Green	Leo Domingues	135	5.5	+5.5
Caterham Residents	Peter Roberts	131	5.3	+5.3
Labour	Jon Wheale	89	3.6	−6.9
Majority		581	23.6	
Turnout		2,458		
Liberal Democrats hold		Swing		

Guildford South East By-Election 16 October 2025
Party	Candidate	Votes	%	±%
Liberal Democrats	Catherine Houston	1,426	41.3	+18.1
Conservative	Alex Fiuza	788	22.8	−8.1
R4GV	John Redpath	565	16.3	−21.4
Reform	Dale Layman	416	12.0	+12.0
Green	Claire Whitehouse	172	5.0	+5.0
Labour	Richard Eggleton	89	2.6	−5.6
Majority		638	18.5	
Turnout		3,456		
Liberal Democrats gain from R4GV		Swing		

Warlingham By-Election 7 May 2026
Party	Candidate	Votes	%	±%
Reform	Jacquie Thomson	1,597	31.8	+31.8
Conservative	Robin Bloore	1,446	28.8	−29.4
Liberal Democrats	Perry Chotai	1,178	23.4	−5.0
Green	Sarah Stewart	329	6.5	+6.5
Independent	Martin Haley	308	6.1	+6.1
Labour	Andrew Waters	171	3.4	−2.1
Majority		151	3.0	
Turnout		5,029		
Reform gain from Conservative		Swing		

Haslemere By-Election 7 July 2026
Party	Candidate	Votes	%	±%
Liberal Democrats	Terry Weldon	1,181	47.8	−2.2
Conservative	Toby Byfield	797	32.3	−10.7
Green	Thomas Shrive	280	11.3	+11.3
Reform	Barb Witt	213	8.6	+8.6
Majority		384	15.5	
Turnout		2,471		
Liberal Democrats hold		Swing		
