= 2023 Guildford Borough Council election =

Local election in Surrey, England

- 4 May 2023

All 48 seats to Guildford Borough Council 25 seats needed for a majority

	First party	Second party	Third party
Leader	Julia McShane	Paul Spooner	Joss Bigmore
Party	Liberal Democrats	Conservative	R4GV
Last election	28.1%	29.6%	23.2%
Seats before	17	9	15
Seats after	25	10	7
Seat change	▲8	▲1	▼8
Percentage	32.1%	26.7%	20.3%
	Fourth party	Fifth party	Sixth party
Leader	James Walsh	Ramsey Nagaty
Party	Labour	GGG	Green
Last election	9.9%	7.8%	1.4%
Seats before	2	4	1
Seats after	3	3	0
Seat change	▲1	▼1	▼1
Percentage	13.2%	3.1%	2.4%
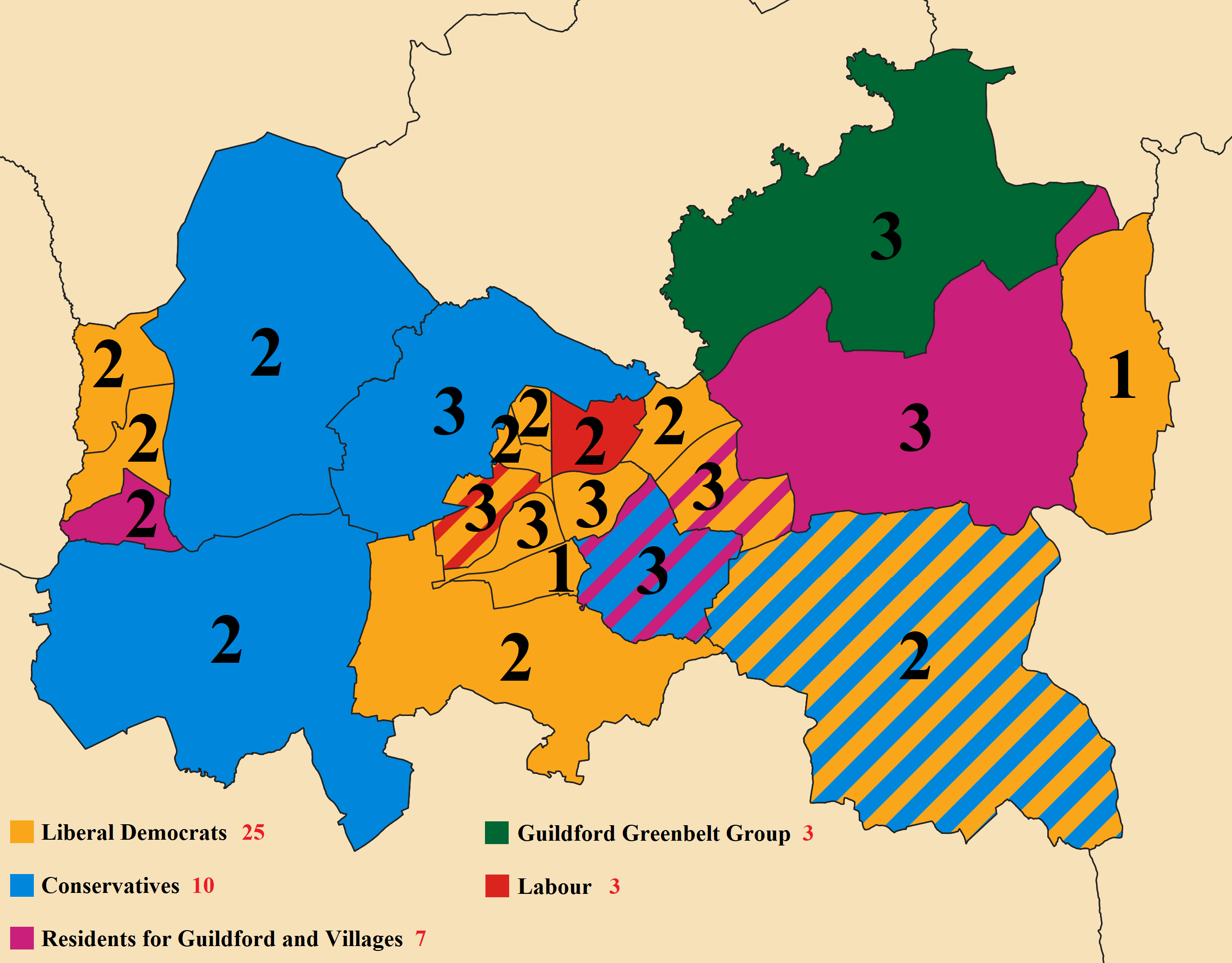
- Map showing the results of the 2023 Guildford Borough Council elections. Numbers indicate the number of councillors elected by each ward. Yellow showing Liberal Democrats, blue showing Conservative, Magenta showing R4GV, dark green showing Guildford Greenbelt Group and red showing Labour. Striped wards have mixed representation.
Leader before election
Julia McShane
Liberal Democrat
No overall control
Leader after election
Julia McShane
Liberal Democrats

The 2023 Guildford Borough Council election was held on 4 May 2023, to elect all 48 seats to the Guildford Borough Council in Surrey, England as part of the 2023 local elections. The results saw the Liberal Democrats take overall control of Guildford Borough Council.

== Boundary changes ==
The election was contested on new ward boundaries following a periodic electoral review by the Local Government Boundary Commission for England. The council size remained unchanged at 48 councillors.

Guildford town

The boundary changes resulted in the abolition of Holy Trinity, Friary & St Nicolas and Christchurch wards in the town centre. St Nicolas was split off to become a new single-member ward. A new three-member Castle ward replaced most of Holy Trinity ward, and a new three-member ward named Stoke replaced most of the Friary area of Friary & St Nicolas ward. The area covered by the former Christchurch ward was split between the new Stoke and Castle wards and also between Burpham and Merrow wards, the latter two of which were both expanded in the direction of the town centre. Elsewhere in the town the ward formerly known as Stoke kept the same boundaries but was renamed as Bellfields & Slyfield with the 'Stoke' name being transferred to the new town centre ward. The ward of Stoughton was split into Stoughton North and Stoughton South, both two-member wards. Westborough ward had its boundary with Onslow adjusted to follow the A3 and the railway line, and also had its boundary with Stoughton South adjusted to largely follow the Aldershot Road. Onslow had its boundary with Stoke and St Nicolas adjusted to follow Farnham Road and the railway line.

Western villages

Worplesdon ward remained completely unchanged. Normandy ward and Pirbright ward were merged to create a new two-member Normandy & Pirbright ward. Ash South & Tongham was split into a new two-member Ash South ward, which has an adjusted boundary with Ash Wharf, and the Tongham area was moved into Pilgrims ward, making it a two-member ward. The boundary between Ash Vale and Ash Wharf was moved to north of Foxhurst Road cul-de-sac. Shalford ward's boundaries were unchanged.

Eastern villages

Effingham, Tillingbourne, and Clandon & Horsley wards remained completely unchanged. Send ward and Lovelace ward were merged to create a new three-member Send & Lovelace ward.

== Background ==
There have been changes to the political make up of the council since the 2019 election. Three by-elections were held, simultaneously with the 2021 Surrey County Council election, to fill vacancies on the council (two due to resignations, one due to the death of a councillor). However, each seat was won by the same party that won it at the 2019 election. Subsequently, in November 2021, a Liberal Democrat councillor defected to the Conservatives, but defected from the Conservatives to sit as an independent in July 2022. A Conservative councillor died in May 2022 and the subsequent by-election was won by the Liberal Democrats. In November 2022 an R4GV councillor left his group to sit as an independent, and in April 2023 a R4GV councillor defected to the Liberal Democrats. Additionally, the sole Green Party councillor chose to sit as part of the R4GV group on the council shortly after the May 2019 election, but continued to be a Green Party councillor, before leaving the R4GV group in October 2022 to sit alone as a Green Party councillor again.

The cumulative impact of these changes resulted in there being 18 Liberal Democrats, 13 R4GV, 8 Conservative, 4 GGG, 2 Labour and 2 Independent councillors going into the election.

After the close of nominations it was revealed that 176 candidates were contesting the 48 seats on the council. The Conservatives contested all 48 seats, the Liberal Democrats stood in 45, Labour contested 31 and R4GV 37 in a partial electoral pact with GGG who were standing another 5 candidates.

One feature of the election was a campaign by a registered non-party campaigner, Robin Horsley, about the proposed re-development of the North Street site in Guildford town centre by property developer St Edwards, which Horsley had previously campaigned against. A planning application for North Street had been rejected in January 2023, and had been the cause of acrimony between R4GV councillors, who had supported the application, and Liberal Democrat councillors who had opposed the application. Robin Horsley's campaign, which attracted significant media coverage, featured a series of videos on what he termed 'the Battle for Guildford', which were promoted on social media and in leaflets, and he urged a vote against R4GV in the election, and for whichever parties or candidates were best placed to defeat R4GV in individual wards, on the grounds that if R4GV were elected he believed they would push through the North Street planning application.

=== Pre-election composition ===
Going in to the election, the council administration consists of a Liberal Democrat/R4GV coalition, with the Conservatives forming the main opposition party.

Council composition by political party allegiance as of April 2023
Political party	Council members	
Liberal Democrats	18	18 / 48
R4GV	13	13 / 48
Conservative	8	8 / 48
GGG	4	4 / 48
Labour	2	2 / 48
Green	1	1 / 48
Independent	2	2 / 48

== Summary ==
=== Election result ===
2023 Guildford Borough Council election
Party	Candidates	Seats	Gains	Losses	Net gain/loss	Seats %	Votes %	Votes	+/−
Liberal Democrats	45	25	9	1	▲8	52.1	32.1	14,365	
Conservative	48	10	6	5	▲1	20.8	26.7	11,961	
R4GV	37	7	0	8	▼8	14.6	20.3	9,067	
Labour	31	3	1	0	▲1	6.3	13.2	5,924	
GGG	5	3	1	2	▼1	6.3	3.1	1,387	
Green	3	0	0	1	▼1	0.0	2.4	1,056	
Independent	3	0	0	0	Steady	0.0	1.9	830	
Peace	3	0	0	0	Steady	0.0	0.2	92	
TUSC	2	0	0	0	Steady	0.0	0.1	36	

Number of councillors per ward is shown in brackets after the ward name.

Wards won solely by the Liberal Democrats – Ash Vale (2); Ash Wharf (2); Burpham (2); Effingham (1); Onslow (3); Shalford (2); Stoke (3); Stoughton North (2); Stoughton South (2); St Nicolas (1)

Wards won solely by the Conservatives – Normandy & Pirbright (2); Pilgrims (2); Worplesdon (3)

Wards won solely by Residents for Guildford and Villages (R4GV) – Ash South (2) Clandon & Horsley (3)

Wards won solely by Guildford Greenbelt Group – Send & Lovelace (3)

Wards won solely by Labour – Bellfields & Slyfield (2)

Wards electing councillors of more than one party – Castle (3 – 2 Con, 1 R4GV); Merrow (3 - 2 Lib Dem, 1 R4GV); Tillingbourne (2 - 1 Lib Dem, 1 Con)

The results saw the Liberal Democrat take overall control of Guildford Borough Council, increasing from 17 seats to 25. Their former coalition partners, R4GV, fell from 15 seats to 7. The Conservatives increased from 9 to 10 seats, making them the official opposition on the council, making a mixture of gains from R4GV and the Greens as well as losses to the Liberal Democrats in Ash Vale and Ash Wharf."Election results by party, 5 May 2023". Guildford Borough Council. 5 May 2023.

The Guildford Greenbelt Group lost 1 seat, bringing their representation down to 3 seats whilst Labour gained a seat from the Liberal Democrats in Westborough, bringing their representation up to 3 seats. The Green Party also lost their sole seat in Tillingbourne ward.

== Ward results ==
The following is a list of candidates and results for each ward of the council.

=== Ash South ===
Ash South (2 seats)
Party	Candidate	Votes	%	±%
R4GV	Sue Wyeth-Price	737	51.6	
R4GV	David Shaw	535	37.4	
Liberal Democrats	Martin Elburn	534	37.4	
Liberal Democrats	Philip Buckley	387	27.1	
Conservative	Carl Flynn	274	19.2	
Conservative	George Wrycroft	244	17.1	
Majority				
Turnout		1,429	31.3	
Rejected ballots		3	0.2	
R4GV win (new seat)				
R4GV win (new seat)				

=== Ash Vale ===
Ash Vale (2 seats)
Party	Candidate	Votes	%	±%
Liberal Democrats	Carla Morson	1,183	67.2	
Liberal Democrats	Richard Lucas	1,070	60.8	
Conservative	Nigel Manning*	571	32.4	
Conservative	Marsha Moseley*	498	28.3	
Majority				
Turnout		1,761	34.4	
Rejected ballots		9	0.5	
Liberal Democrats win (new seat)				
Liberal Democrats win (new seat)				

=== Ash Wharf ===
Ash Wharf (2 seats)
Party	Candidate	Votes	%	±%
Liberal Democrats	Fiona White*	699	48.6	
Liberal Democrats	Philip Bellamy	617	42.9	
Conservative	John Tonks	475	33.1	
Conservative	Wendy Pritchard	379	26.4	
Labour	Mick Gallagher	280	19.5	
Green	Claire Whitehouse	246	17.1	
Majority				
Turnout		1,437	29.6	
Rejected ballots		6	0.4	
Liberal Democrats win (new seat)				
Liberal Democrats win (new seat)				

=== Bellfields and Slyfield ===
Bellfields and Slyfield (2 seats; same boundaries as previous ‘Stoke’ ward)
Party	Candidate	Votes	%	±%
Labour	Amanda Creese	453	41.8	
Labour	James Walsh*	419	38.7	
Conservative	Philip Hooper	336	31.0	
Liberal Democrats	Wendy Wakeling	327	30.2	
Conservative	Suleman Miah	288	26.6	
Liberal Democrats	Nicholas Strugnell	257	23.7	
R4GV	Steve Isaacs	172	15.9	
R4GV	Linda Tillett	163	15.0	
Majority				
Turnout		1,084	28.8	
Rejected ballots		6	0.6	
Labour hold		Swing		
Labour hold		Swing		

=== Burpham ===
Burpham (2 seats)
Party	Candidate	Votes	%	±%
Liberal Democrats	George Potter*	1,065	45.6	
Liberal Democrats	Jane Tyson	839	35.9	
Conservative	Christian Holliday	669	28.6	
Conservative	Adam Heilbron	668	28.6	
R4GV	Liz Hyland	465	19.9	
Labour	Ian Creese	378	16.2	
R4GV	Charles Wilce	358	15.3	
Majority				
Turnout		2,337	47.4	
Rejected ballots		10	0.4	
Liberal Democrats win (new seat)				
Liberal Democrats win (new seat)				

=== Castle ===
Castle (3 seats)
Party	Candidate	Votes	%	±%
R4GV	Maddy Redpath*	1,159	35.2	
Conservative	Richard Mills	1,128	34.3	
Conservative	Geoff Davis	1,091	33.1	
R4GV	John Redpath*	1,074	32.6	
Conservative	Alex Perestaj de Gusmao Fiuza	964	29.3	
Liberal Democrats	Ciarán Doran	910	27.6	
R4GV	John Rigg*	909	27.6	
Liberal Democrats	Sara Gillingham	779	23.7	
Labour	Joan O'Byrne	439	13.3	
Labour	Sean Sussex	325	9.9	
Labour	Matthew Smith	303	9.2	
Independent	Paul Canning	263	8.0	
Majority				
Turnout		3,293	46.1	
Rejected ballots		8	0.2	
R4GV win (new seat)				
Conservative win (new seat)				
Conservative win (new seat)				

=== Clandon and Horsley ===
Clandon and Horsley (3 seats)
Party	Candidate	Votes	%	±%
R4GV	Catherine Young*	1,949	62.4	
R4GV	Dawn Bennett	1,859	59.5	
R4GV	Ruth Brothwell*	1,804	57.7	
Conservative	Stephen Cullens	667	21.4	
Conservative	Ian Bond	641	20.5	
Conservative	Toni Hourahane	595	19.0	
Liberal Democrats	Wendy Ross	400	12.8	
Liberal Democrats	David Roe	360	11.5	
Liberal Democrats	Liam O'Keeffe	334	10.7	
Labour	Dan Symonds	309	9.9	
Majority				
Turnout		3,124	44.0	
Rejected ballots		15	0.5	
R4GV hold		Swing		
R4GV hold		Swing		
R4GV hold		Swing		

=== Effingham ===
Effingham
Party	Candidate	Votes	%	±%
Liberal Democrats	Merel Rehorst-Smith	521	64.8	
Conservative	Lulu Boder	240	29.9	
Labour	Shek Rahman	43	5.3	
Majority				
Turnout		811	41.5	
Rejected ballots		7	0.9	
Liberal Democrats hold		Swing		

=== Merrow ===
Merrow (3 seats)
Party	Candidate	Votes	%	±%
Liberal Democrats	Jo Shaw	1,315	41.1	
Liberal Democrats	Yves de Contades	1,094	34.2	
R4GV	Joss Bigmore*	995	31.1	
Conservative	David Humphries	954	29.8	
R4GV	Dennis Booth*	866	27.0	
Conservative	Katie Lam	861	26.9	
Conservative	Christopher Jay	815	25.4	
R4GV	Stuart Brown	736	23.0	
Labour	Nathan Cassidy	648	20.2	
Independent	Graham Ellwood	487	15.2	
Majority				
Turnout		3,203	44.8	
Rejected ballots		9	0.3	
Liberal Democrats win (new seat)				
Liberal Democrats win (new seat)				
R4GV win (new seat)				

=== Normandy and Pirbright ===
Normandy and Pirbright (2 seats)
Party	Candidate	Votes	%	±%
Conservative	Keith Witham*	938	58.0	
Conservative	David Bilbé*	840	52.0	
Liberal Democrats	Ken Howard	341	21.1	
R4GV	Geoff Doven	324	20.0	
Labour	Simon Schofield	282	17.5	
R4GV	Gina Redpath	213	13.2	
Independent	Jane Hill	80	5.0	
Majority				
Turnout		1,616	35.6	
Rejected ballots		7	0.4	
Conservative win (new seat)				
Conservative win (new seat)				

=== Onslow ===
Onslow (3 seats)
Party	Candidate	Votes	%	±%
Liberal Democrats	Angela Goodwin*	1,272	57.9	
Liberal Democrats	James Jones	933	42.5	
Liberal Democrats	Steven Lee*	908	41.3	
Conservative	Adrian Chandler	479	21.8	
Conservative	Shamsul Alam	425	19.4	
R4GV	Howard Moss	395	18.0	
Conservative	Adam Ekinci	391	17.8	
R4GV	James Heaphy	389	17.7	
R4GV	Lynsey Brown	317	14.4	
Labour	Hannah Rich	289	13.2	
Labour	Nick Bragger	273	12.4	
Labour	Vlad Stoiana-Mois	193	8.8	
TUSC	Sam Church	36	1.6	
TUSC	James Lewis	35	1.6	
Majority				
Turnout		2,196	43.6	
Rejected ballots		6	0.3	
Liberal Democrats win (new seat)				
Liberal Democrats win (new seat)				
Liberal Democrats win (new seat)				

=== Pilgrims ===
Pilgrims (2 seats)
Party	Candidate	Votes	%	±%
Conservative	Matt Furniss	835	56.8	
Conservative	Sallie Barker	749	51.0	
R4GV	Toni Belcher	358	24.4	
R4GV	John Price	238	16.2	
Liberal Democrats	Stephen Mallet	234	15.9	
Liberal Democrats	Amy Rogers	196	13.3	
Labour	Malcolm Hill	150	10.2	
Majority				
Turnout		1,469	36.5	
Rejected ballots		12	0.8	
Conservative win (new seat)				
Conservative win (new seat)				

=== Send and Lovelace ===
Send and Lovelace (3 seats)
Party	Candidate	Votes	%	±%
GGG	Pat Oven	980	46.6	
GGG	James Brooker	960	45.6	
GGG	Jason Fenwick	855	40.6	
R4GV	Pete Bennett	515	24.5	
R4GV	Geraldine Powell	506	24.0	
Conservative	Anna Griffiths	473	22.5	
Conservative	Alexander Stewart-Clark	425	20.2	
Conservative	Justin Offord	379	18.0	
Liberal Democrats	Basil Bahrani	192	9.1	
Liberal Democrats	Duncan McMillan	189	9.0	
Labour	Jordan Baker	188	8.9	
Labour	Rob Woof	186	8.8	
Liberal Democrats	Dale Miller	181	8.6	
Majority				
Turnout		2,105	38.7	
Rejected ballots		6	0.3	
GGG win (new seat)				
GGG win (new seat)				
GGG win (new seat)				

=== Shalford ===
Shalford (2 seats)
Party	Candidate	Votes	%	±%
Liberal Democrats	Catherine Houston	947	50.3	
Liberal Democrats	Dominique Williams	760	40.4	
Conservative	Jonathan Fremaux	476	25.3	
Conservative	Nicholas Watts	470	25.0	
GGG	Ramsey Nagaty*	407	21.6	
GGG	Nigel Keane	333	17.7	
Labour	Peter Lockhart	182	9.7	
Majority				
Turnout		1,883	45.5	
Rejected ballots		9	0.5	
Liberal Democrats gain from R4GV		Swing		
Liberal Democrats gain from GGG		Swing		

=== St Nicolas ===
St Nicolas
Party	Candidate	Votes	%	±%
Liberal Democrats	Tom Hunt*	518	46.2	
Conservative	Marisa Goldsborough	252	22.5	
R4GV	Nikki Ackerley	250	22.3	
Labour	Chris Pegsman	101	9.0	
Majority				
Turnout		1,124	50.1	
Rejected ballots		3	0.3	
Liberal Democrats win (new seat)				

=== Stoke ===
Stoke (3 seats)
Party	Candidate	Votes	%	±%
Liberal Democrats	Cait Taylor*	634	33.0	
Liberal Democrats	Vanessa King	629	32.7	
Liberal Democrats	Stephen Hives	578	30.1	
Green	Sam Peters	516	26.8	
Labour	Harriet Kittermaster	467	24.3	
Labour	Sue Hackman	460	23.9	
Labour	Brian Creese	431	22.4	
R4GV	Arjun Lakhani	340	17.7	
Conservative	Sam Tough	319	16.6	
R4GV	Annelize Kidd	318	16.5	
Conservative	Brett Vorley	290	15.1	
Conservative	Stuart Zissman	283	14.7	
R4GV	Julian Lyon	256	13.3	
Majority				
Turnout		1,923	34.9	
Rejected ballots		8	0.4	
Liberal Democrats win (new seat)				
Liberal Democrats win (new seat)				
Liberal Democrats win (new seat)				

=== Stoughton North ===
Stoughton North (2 seats)
Party	Candidate	Votes	%	±%
Liberal Democrats	Gillian Harwood*	750	47.1	
Liberal Democrats	Lizzie Griffiths	684	42.9	
Conservative	David Quelch	423	26.6	
Conservative	Stephen Rowden	336	21.1	
Labour	Andy Giess	284	17.8	
Labour	Shelley Grainger	252	15.8	
R4GV	Neda Moghaddam	164	10.3	
R4GV	Bill Stokoe	162	10.2	
Majority				
Turnout		1,593	37.3	
Rejected ballots		11	0.7	
Liberal Democrats win (new seat)				
Liberal Democrats win (new seat)				

=== Stoughton South ===
Stoughton South (2 seats)
Party	Candidate	Votes	%	±%
Liberal Democrats	Katie Steel	660	40.5	
Liberal Democrats	Masuk Miah*	653	40.1	
Labour	Anne Rouse	420	25.8	
Labour	George Dokimakis	407	25.0	
Conservative	Alex Dinc	294	18.1	
Conservative	Andre Hester	243	14.9	
R4GV	Zoë Nash-Williams	190	11.7	
R4GV	Tom Johnston	155	9.5	
Peace	John Morris	92	5.7	
Majority				
Turnout		1,628	37.8	
Rejected ballots		4	0.2	
Liberal Democrats win (new seat)				
Liberal Democrats win (new seat)				

=== Tillingbourne ===
Tillingbourne (2 seats)
Party	Candidate	Votes	%	±%
Liberal Democrats	Danielle Newson	801	44.4	
Conservative	Bob Hughes	781	43.3	
Conservative	Lynette Nusbacher	667	37.0	
Liberal Democrats	Paul Abbey*	630	34.9	
Green	Lucy Howard	294	16.3	
Labour	Jim Wynn	118	6.5	
Labour	John Marsh	111	6.2	
Majority				
Turnout		1,803	40.9	
Rejected ballots		7	0.4	
Liberal Democrats gain from Green		Swing		
Conservative hold		Swing		

=== Westborough ===
Westborough (3 seats)
Party	Candidate	Votes	%	±%
Liberal Democrats	Julia McShane*	599	45.8	
Liberal Democrats	Sandy Lowry	570	43.6	
Labour	Howard Smith	508	38.8	
Liberal Democrats	James Steel*	450	34.4	
Conservative	Syed Selim	290	22.2	
Conservative	Mike Parsons	263	20.1	
Conservative	Paul Spooner*	249	19.0	
R4GV	Shailja Lal	199	15.2	
R4GV	Shivendra Lal	180	13.8	
Majority				
Turnout		1,308	24.5	
Rejected ballots		7	0.5	
Liberal Democrats win (new seat)				
Liberal Democrats win (new seat)				
Labour win (new seat)				

=== Worplesdon ===
Worplesdon (3 seats)
Party	Candidate	Votes	%	±%
Conservative	Honor Brooker	1,087	41.6	
Conservative	Bill Akhtar	1,071	41.0	
Conservative	Philip Brooker	1,052	40.2	
R4GV	Bob McShee*	855	32.7	
R4GV	Brigitte Ahier	721	27.6	
R4GV	Robert Pidgeon	630	24.1	
Liberal Democrats	Jon Edwards	463	17.7	
Liberal Democrats	Marilyn Merryweather	462	17.7	
Labour	John Hawthorne	385	14.7	
Labour	Nick Trier	382	14.6	
Liberal Democrats	Sinclair Webster	352	13.5	
Majority				
Turnout		2,615	40.1	
Rejected ballots		8	0.3	
Conservative gain from R4GV		Swing		
Conservative gain from R4GV		Swing		
Conservative gain from R4GV		Swing		

== Changes 2023–2026 ==
=== By-elections ===
==== Onslow ====
Onslow: 7 May 2026
Party	Candidate	Votes	%	±%
Liberal Democrats	James Steel	1,145	49.1	
Green	Claire Whitehouse	563	24.2	
Conservative	André Hester	281	12.1	
Reform	Adam Farkas	242	10.4	
Labour	Hannah Rich	86	3.7	
Registered electors		5,269		
Turnout		2,330	44.2	
Rejected ballots		13	0.6	
Liberal Democrats hold		Swing		

The by-election was triggered by the resignation of Liberal Democrat councillor James Jones, who stood down after relocating to London for work.
