= 2019 Guildford Borough Council election =

Local election in Surrey, England

- 2 May 2019

All 48 seats to Guildford Borough Council 25 seats needed for a majority
| | First party | Second party | Third party |
|---|---|---|---|
| Leader | Caroline Reeves | Joss Bigmore | Paul Spooner |
| Party | Liberal Democrats | R4GV | Conservative |
| Leader's seat | Friary & St Nicolas | Christchurch | Ash South & Tongham |
| Last election | 9 seats, 22.32% | New party | 35 seats, 46.77% |
| Seats won | 17 | 15 | 9 |
| Seat change | ▲8 | ▲15 | ▼26 |
| Popular vote | 24,786 | 20,488 | 26,047 |
| Percentage | 28.1% | 23.2% | 29.6% |
| Swing | ▲5.8% | New party | ▼17.2% |
| | Fourth party | Fifth party | Sixth party |
| Leader | Susan Parker | Angela Gunning | Diana Jones |
| Party | GGG | Labour | Green |
| Leader's seat | Send | Stoke | Tillingbourne |
| Last election | 3 seats, 13.02% | 1 seats, 11.08% | 0 seats, 2.83% |
| Seats won | 4 | 2 | 1 |
| Seat change | ▲1 | ▲1 | ▲1 |
| Popular vote | 6,917 | 8,713 | 1,229 |
| Percentage | 7.8% | 9.9% | 1.4% |
| Swing | ▼5.2% | ▼1.2% | ▼1.4% |
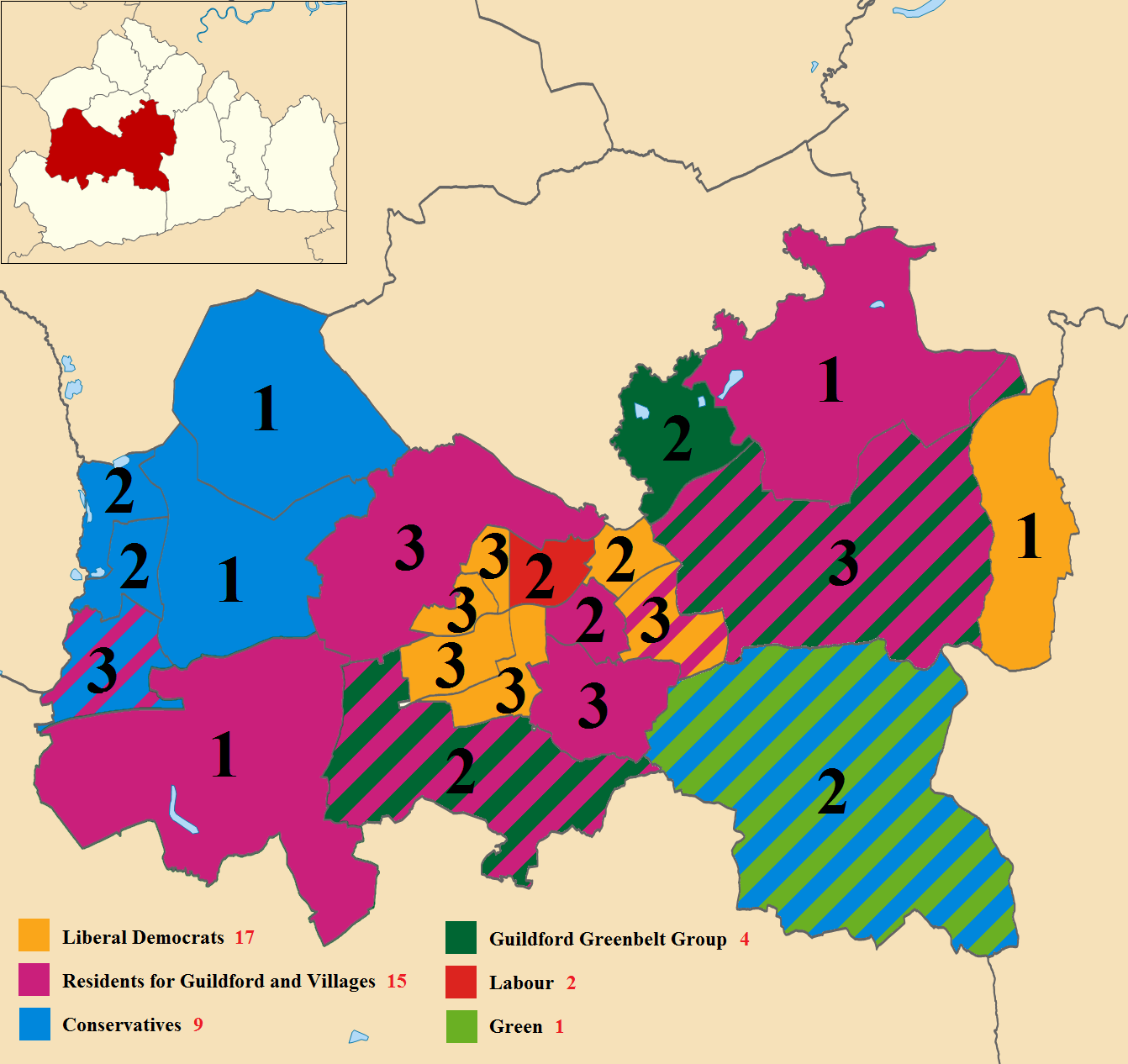
- Map showing the results of the 2019 Guildford Borough Council elections. Numbers indicate the number of councillors elected by each ward. Yellow showing Liberal Democrats, Magenta showing R4GV, blue showing Conservative, dark green showing Guildford Greenbelt Group, red showing Labour and light green showing Green. Striped wards have mixed representation.
Council control before election
Conservative
Council control after election
No Overall Control

The 2019 Guildford Borough Council election was held on 2 May 2019, to elect all 48 seats to the Guildford Borough Council in Surrey, England as part of the 2019 local elections.

The Liberal Democrats won the most seats (17), the Residents for Guildford and Villages, a new political party formed in early 2019, came second with 15 seats, while the ruling Conservatives lost their majority, coming third with 9 seats. Other parties such as the Guildford Greenbelt Group (4), the Labour Party (2) and the Green Party (1) won seats.

== Background ==
Since the 2015 local election, there had been changes to the political make up of the council. Prior to the election Labour had gained one seat from the Conservatives in the Stoke by-election in May 2016, and a total of four councillors had defected from their parties to sit as an Independent Alliance group. Two Conservative councillors, Tony Rooth (a former council leader) and Bob McShee, defected to sit as independents in May 2018 and were joined by Colin Cross from the Liberal Democrats in November 2018. All of them cited dissatisfaction with their group leaderships as reasons for defection, particularly in relation to issues around Guildford's draft Local Plan In February 2019 a further Conservative councillor, Nils Christiansen, defected to the independent group.

In the run up to the election the Independent Alliance councillors were involved in the creation of a new party, Residents for Guildford and Villages (R4GV), to contest the borough elections on a platform of changing the Local Plan. The creation of the new party was supported by individuals who had been active within the Guildford Society and the Guildford Vision Group (a civic society group campaigning for alternative planning policies within Guildford town), and was led by a local investor, Joss Bigmore. Three of the four independent councillors were involved in the creation of R4GV and joined it to stand for re-election under the party label.

The Local Plan proved a controversial topic in the run-up to the election, having already provided an impetus for the creation of the Guildford Greenbelt Group (GGG) party prior to the 2015 election (where it had won three seats).The draft Local Plan set out plans for the building 10,678 new houses by 2034, including three major 'strategic sites' located on green belt land, and became one of the main issues of the 2019 election campaign. A vote on adopting the Local Plan was scheduled by the Conservative administration for 25 April 2019, just one week before the election, attracting criticism from opposition parties who claimed this was a violation of the pre-election "purdah" period. Despite public protests, and attempts by opposition parties to defer the vote until after the local election, the vote went ahead as scheduled with a majority of councillors voting to adopt the Local Plan.

During the election campaign the parties contesting the election set out their positions on a range of issues. The Conservatives, as the incumbent administration, defended the Local Plan and their record of running Guildford Borough Council, especially in the area of arts and culture, arguing that a re-elected Conservative administration would "enhance" the borough's sporting, community and recreational facilities. The Liberal Democrats, as the main opposition group, outlined plans to protect the environment, take action on climate change and build more social housing. R4GV and GGG both campaigned on making changes to the Local Plan and on the basis that they would be an improvement over the presence of national political parties in local government. Labour argued that they were the only party offering real change in Guildford and advocated investment in public services.

At the election R4GV and GGG co-operated, standing candidates together in two wards and not standing against each other in other wards, but only stood a total of 21 candidates between them. The Liberal Democrats stood 32 candidates, not contesting some wards, whilst the Conservatives contested every ward. In the run up to the election there was media speculation and analysis suggesting that R4GV and the Liberal Democrats had been selective in where they had stood candidates in order to maximise the anti-Conservative vote.

== Summary ==
=== Election result ===
2019 Guildford Borough Council election
| Party | Candidates | Seats | Gains | Losses | Net gain/loss | Seats % | Votes % | Votes | +/− |
|---|---|---|---|---|---|---|---|---|---|
| Liberal Democrats | 32 | 17 | 9 | 1 | ▲8 | 35.4 | 28.1 | 24,786 | |
| R4GV | 17 | 15 | 15 | 0 | ▲15 | 31.3 | 23.2 | 20,488 | |
| Conservative | 48 | 9 | 0 | 26 | ▼26 | 18.8 | 29.6 | 26,047 | |
| GGG | 6 | 4 | 1 | 0 | ▲1 | 8.3 | 7.8 | 6,917 | |
| Labour | 28 | 2 | 1 | 0 | ▲1 | 4.2 | 9.9 | 8,713 | |
| Green | 2 | 1 | 1 | 0 | ▲1 | 2.1 | 1.4 | 1,229 | |
| Peace | 3 | 0 | 0 | 0 | Steady | 0.0 | 0.5 | 459 | |
| Independent | 1 | 0 | 0 | 0 | Steady | 0.0 | 0.1 | 128 | |

Number of councillors per ward is shown in brackets after the ward name.

Wards won solely by the Liberal Democrats – Burpham (2); Friary & St Nicolas (3); Effingham (1); Onslow (3); Stoughton (3); Westborough (3)

Wards won solely by Residents for Guildford and Villages (R4GV) – Christchurch (3); Holy Trinity (3); Lovelace (1); Pilgrims (1); Worplesdon (3)

Wards won solely by the Conservatives – Ash Vale (2); Ash Wharf (2); Pirbright (1); Normandy (1)

Wards won solely by Guildford Greenbelt Group – Send (2)

Wards won solely by Labour – Stoke (2)

Wards electing councillors of more than one party – Ash South & Tongham (3 – 2 Con, 1 R4GV); Clandon & Horsley (3 – 2 R4GV, 1 Guildford Greenbelt); Merrow (3 - 1 R4GV, 2 Lib Dem); Shalford (2 - 1 R4GV, 1 Guildford Greenbelt), Tillingbourne (2 - 1 Con, 1 Green)

The results saw the Conservatives lose control of Guildford Borough Council, falling from 31 seats to 9, making the Liberal Democrats the largest party on 17 seats.

Prior to the election, 3 councillors had defected from the Conservatives and 1 had defected from the Liberal Democrats to form the Independent Alliance on the council. The Independent Alliance registered Residents for Guildford and Villages as a political party to contest the 2019 elections and proceeded to win 15 seats.

The Guildford Greenbelt Group increased their representation to 4 seats whilst Labour maintained a by-election gain from the Conservatives to emerge with 2 seats.

The Green party also won their first seat on Guildford Borough Council in Tillingbourne ward.

== Aftermath ==
Following the election the Green councillor chose to sit on the council as part of the R4GV group.

On 15 May 2019 councillors voted by 23 to 19 to elect the Liberal Democrat group leader, Caroline Reeves, as Leader of Guildford Borough Council over the leader of the R4GV group, Joss Bigmore. On 20 May 2019 Caroline Reeves announced that (including herself) the council's Cabinet would consist of 8 Liberal Democrats, 1 R4GV and 1 GGG councillor with an additional R4GV councillor attending cabinet as a non-voting deputy. However, on 27 August 2019 the GGG member of the Cabinet resigned and was subsequently replaced by an additional R4GV councillor (the formerly non-voting deputy member of the Cabinet).

In May 2020 it was announced that an agreement had been reached between the Liberal Democrats and R4GV to rotate the council leadership between them as part of a coalition arrangement which saw four Liberal Democrat councillors leave the council's Cabinet and be replaced by two R4GV councillors to create an evenly split cabinet of four Liberal Democrat and four R4GV councillors.

== Ward by Ward ==
In each of the wards indicated with an *, one of the R4GV gains is a notional one due to one councillor elected in the ward in 2015 having already defected to R4GV prior to the 2019 election being called. In all wards a 'gain' is defined as a seat gained from the party who won it at the most recent election even if the party who won it in 2015 no longer held it going in to the 2019 election.

Ash South & Tongham (top 3 candidates elected)
| Party | Candidate | Votes | % | ±% |
|---|---|---|---|---|
| Conservative | Graham Eyre | 973 | 51.6 | |
| R4GV | Paul Abbey | 961 | 51.0 | |
| Conservative | Paul Spooner | 853 | 45.3 | |
| Conservative | Nigel Kearse | 817 | 43.3 | |
| Liberal Democrats | Philip Buckley | 519 | 27.5 | |
| Liberal Democrats | Sinclair Webster | 484 | 25.7 | |
| Turnout | | 1,885 | 30.4 | |
| Rejected ballots | | 30 | 1.6 | |
| Conservative hold | | Swing | | |
| R4GV gain from Conservative | | Swing | | |
| Conservative hold | | Swing | | |

Ash Vale (top 2 candidates elected)
| Party | Candidate | Votes | % | ±% |
|---|---|---|---|---|
| Conservative | Nigel Manning | 631 | 57.9 | |
| Conservative | Marsha Moseley | 619 | 56.8 | |
| Liberal Democrats | Miranda Hoegen | 477 | 43.8 | |
| Turnout | | 1,089 | 25.6 | |
| Rejected ballots | | 30 | 2.8 | |
| Conservative hold | | Swing | | |
| Conservative hold | | Swing | | |

Ash Wharf (top 2 candidates elected)
| Party | Candidate | Votes | % | ±% |
|---|---|---|---|---|
| Conservative | Jo Randall | 763 | 58.4 | |
| Conservative | Andrew Gomm | 756 | 57.9 | |
| Green | Sam Richards | 484 | 37.1 | |
| Liberal Democrats | Roslyn McMillan | 294 | 22.5 | |
| Turnout | | 1,306 | 28.3 | |
| Rejected ballots | | 24 | 1.8 | |
| Conservative hold | | Swing | | |
| Conservative hold | | Swing | | |

Burpham (top 2 candidates elected)
| Party | Candidate | Votes | % | ±% |
|---|---|---|---|---|
| Liberal Democrats | Ted Mayne | 972 | 53.8 | |
| Liberal Democrats | George Potter | 922 | 51.0 | |
| Conservative | Christian Holliday | 610 | 33.7 | |
| Conservative | Mike Piper | 568 | 31.4 | |
| Labour | Sue Hackman | 242 | 13.4 | |
| Labour | Poppy Ni Bhroithe-Barnett | 180 | 10.0 | |
| Majority | | | | |
| Turnout | | 1,808 | 42.7 | |
| Rejected ballots | | 29 | 1.6 | |
| Liberal Democrats gain from Conservative | | Swing | | |
| Liberal Democrats gain from Conservative | | Swing | | |

Christchurch (top 2 candidates elected)
| Party | Candidate | Votes | % | ±% |
|---|---|---|---|---|
| R4GV | Joss Bigmore | 1,042 | 50.5 | |
| R4GV | Dennis Booth | 845 | 40.9 | |
| Conservative | Matt Furniss | 673 | 32.6 | |
| Conservative | Nikki Nelson-Smith | 608 | 29.4 | |
| Liberal Democrats | Paul Hienkens | 450 | 21.8 | |
| Labour | Joan O'Byrne | 193 | 9.3 | |
| Labour | Mark Redhead | 143 | 6.9 | |
| Majority | | | | |
| Turnout | | 2,065 | 47.9 | |
| Rejected ballots | | 6 | 0.3 | |
| R4GV gain from Conservative | | Swing | | |
| R4GV gain from Conservative | | Swing | | |

Clandon & Horsley (top 3 candidates elected)
| Party | Candidate | Votes | % | ±% |
|---|---|---|---|---|
| GGG | Catherine-Anne Young | 2,907 | 76.7 | |
| R4GV | Tim Anderson | 2,726 | 71.9 | |
| R4GV | Christopher Barrass | 2,666 | 70.3 | |
| Conservative | Jonathan Rogerson | 947 | 25.0 | |
| Conservative | Caroline Heath-Taylor | 704 | 18.6 | |
| Conservative | Alex Fiuza | 532 | 14.0 | |
| Majority | | | | |
| Turnout | | 3,790 | 55.0 | |
| Rejected ballots | | 16 | 0.4 | |
| GGG hold | | Swing | | |
| R4GV gain from Conservative | | Swing | | |
| R4GV gain from Conservative | | Swing | | |

Effingham (top 1 candidate elected)
| Party | Candidate | Votes | % | ±% |
|---|---|---|---|---|
| Liberal Democrats | Liz Hogger | 529 | 56.8 | |
| GGG | Ben Paton | 245 | 26.3 | |
| Conservative | Christopher Jay | 147 | 15.8 | |
| Majority | | 284 | 30.5 | |
| Turnout | | 931 | 44.9 | |
| Rejected ballots | | 10 | 1.1 | |
| Liberal Democrats hold | | Swing | | |

Friary & St Nicolas (top 3 candidates elected)
| Party | Candidate | Votes | % | ±% |
|---|---|---|---|---|
| Liberal Democrats | Caroline Reeves | 1,371 | 58.9 | |
| Liberal Democrats | Angela Goodwin | 1,332 | 52.4 | |
| Liberal Democrats | Tom Hunt | 1,134 | 44.6 | |
| R4GV | Fiona Davidson | 937 | 36.9 | |
| Conservative | John De Wit | 409 | 16.1 | |
| Conservative | Bill Stokoe | 405 | 15.9 | |
| Labour | Elizabeth Mpyisi | 381 | 15.0 | |
| Labour | Brian Creese | 336 | 13.2 | |
| Conservative | Vaibhav Pant | 331 | 13.0 | |
| Labour | Matthew Smith | 313 | 12.3 | |
| Majority | | | | |
| Turnout | | 2,541 | 37.6 | |
| Rejected ballots | | 10 | 0.4 | |
| Liberal Democrats gain from Conservative | | Swing | | |
| Liberal Democrats hold | | Swing | | |
| Liberal Democrats hold | | Swing | | |

Holy Trinity Ward (top 3 candidates elected) *
| Party | Candidate | Votes | % | ±% |
|---|---|---|---|---|
| R4GV | Maddy Redpath | 968 | 37.9 | |
| R4GV | John Redpath | 932 | 36.5 | |
| R4GV | John Rigg | 911 | 35.7 | |
| Liberal Democrats | Ciarán Doran | 860 | 33.7 | |
| Liberal Democrats | Jennifer Gale | 834 | 32.7 | |
| Liberal Democrats | Stephen Mallet | 644 | 25.2 | |
| Conservative | Alexandra Chesterfield | 617 | 24.2 | |
| Conservative | Geoff Davis | 615 | 24.1 | |
| Conservative | Gerry Lytle | 559 | 21.9 | |
| Labour | Gregory Clack | 211 | 8.3 | |
| Labour | Chris Pegman | 184 | 7.2 | |
| Labour | Alexander Scott | 154 | 6.0 | |
| Majority | | | | |
| Turnout | | 2,551 | 42.0 | |
| Rejected ballots | | 9 | 0.4 | |
| R4GV gain from Conservative | | Swing | | |
| R4GV gain from Conservative | | Swing | | |
| R4GV gain from Conservative | | Swing | | |

Lovelace (top 1 candidate elected) *
| Party | Candidate | Votes | % | ±% |
|---|---|---|---|---|
| R4GV | Colin Cross | 789 | 90.5 | |
| Conservative | Julie Iles | 83 | 9.5 | |
| Majority | | 707 | | |
| Turnout | | 882 | 45.6 | |
| Rejected ballots | | 10 | 1.1 | |
| R4GV gain from Liberal Democrats | | Swing | | |

Merrow (top 3 candidates elected)
| Party | Candidate | Votes | % | ±% |
|---|---|---|---|---|
| R4GV | Deborah Seabrook | 1,731 | 62.9 | |
| Liberal Democrats | Steven Lee | 1,047 | 38.1 | |
| Liberal Democrats | Jan Harwood | 976 | 35.5 | |
| Conservative | Jennifer Jordan | 856 | 31.1 | |
| Conservative | Philip Brooker | 789 | 28.7 | |
| Conservative | Graham Ellwood | 656 | 23.9 | |
| Labour | John Hawthorne | 345 | 12.5 | |
| Labour | Michael Hill | 327 | 11.9 | |
| Labour | Michael Hassell | 294 | 10.7 | |
| Majority | | | | |
| Turnout | | 2,750 | 45.9 | |
| Rejected ballots | | 6 | 0.2 | |
| R4GV gain from Conservative | | Swing | | |
| Liberal Democrats gain from Conservative | | Swing | | |
| Liberal Democrats gain from Conservative | | Swing | | |

Normandy (top 1 candidate elected)
| Party | Candidate | Votes | % | ±% |
|---|---|---|---|---|
| Conservative | David Bilbé | 451 | 41.7 | |
| Liberal Democrats | Henry Kay | 382 | 35.3 | |
| GGG | Peter Elliott | 248 | 22.9 | |
| Majority | | | | |
| Turnout | | 1094 | 44.4 | |
| Rejected ballots | | 13 | 1.2 | |
| Conservative hold | | Swing | | |

Onslow (top 3 candidates elected)
| Party | Candidate | Votes | % | ±% |
|---|---|---|---|---|
| Liberal Democrats | David Goodwin | 891 | 47.5 | |
| Liberal Democrats | Jon Askew | 819 | 43.6 | |
| Liberal Democrats | Will Salmon | 815 | 43.4 | |
| R4GV | Howard Moss | 775 | 41.3 | |
| Conservative | Adrian Chandler | 419 | 22.3 | |
| Conservative | Helen Harris | 399 | 21.3 | |
| Labour | Jacob Allen | 336 | 17.9 | |
| Labour | Richard Mithen | 301 | 16.0 | |
| Conservative | Neil Ward | 187 | 10.0 | |
| Majority | | | | |
| Turnout | | 1,877 | 34.9 | |
| Rejected ballots | | 3 | 0.2 | |
| Liberal Democrats gain from Conservative | | Swing | | |
| Liberal Democrats hold | | Swing | | |
| Liberal Democrats hold | | Swing | | |

Pilgrims (top 1 candidate elected) *
| Party | Candidate | Votes | % | ±% |
|---|---|---|---|---|
| R4GV | Tony Rooth | 570 | 65.0 | |
| Conservative | Sallie Barker | 307 | 35.0 | |
| Majority | | 263 | 30.0 | |
| Turnout | | 890 | 52.5 | |
| Rejected ballots | | 13 | 1.5 | |
| R4GV gain from Conservative | | Swing | | |

Pirbright (top 1 candidate elected)
| Party | Candidate | Votes | % | ±% |
|---|---|---|---|---|
| Conservative | Gordon Jackson | 392 | 67.4 | |
| Liberal Democrats | Russel Sherrard-Smith | 127 | 21.8 | |
| Labour | Akanshya Gurung | 63 | 10.8 | |
| Majority | | | | |
| Turnout | | 587 | 29.3 | |
| Rejected ballots | | 0 | 0.0 | |
| Conservative hold | | Swing | | |

Send (top 2 candidates elected)
| Party | Candidate | Votes | % | ±% |
|---|---|---|---|---|
| GGG | Patrick Sheard | 1,217 | 75.5 | |
| GGG | Susan Parker | 1,150 | 71.3 | |
| Conservative | Julia Osborn | 357 | 22.1 | |
| Conservative | Alexander Stewart-Clark | 234 | 14.5 | |
| Labour | Rob Woof | 139 | 8.6 | |
| Majority | | | | |
| Turnout | | 1,612 | 47.6 | |
| Rejected ballots | | 6 | 0.4 | |
| GGG hold | | Swing | | |
| GGG hold | | Swing | | |

Shalford (top 2 candidates elected)
| Party | Candidate | Votes | % | ±% |
|---|---|---|---|---|
| R4GV | Chris Blow | 825 | 46.1 | |
| GGG | Ramsey Nagaty | 637 | 35.6 | |
| Conservative | Michael Parsons | 489 | 27.3 | |
| Conservative | Bob Hughes | 431 | 24.1 | |
| Liberal Democrats | Jillian Doran | 336 | 18.8 | |
| Liberal Democrats | Vanessa King | 294 | 16.4 | |
| Labour | Tim Wolfenden | 181 | 10.1 | |
| Independent | Mark Taylor | 128 | 7.1 | |
| Majority | | | | |
| Turnout | | 1,791 | 42.9 | |
| Rejected ballots | | 6 | 0.3 | |
| R4GV gain from Conservative | | Swing | | |
| GGG gain from Conservative | | Swing | | |

Stoke (top 2 candidates elected)
| Party | Candidate | Votes | % | ±% |
|---|---|---|---|---|
| Labour | Angela Gunning | 648 | 52.1 | |
| Labour | James Walsh | 496 | 39.9 | |
| Liberal Democrats | Lizzie Griffiths | 424 | 34.1 | |
| Conservative | Paul Mackie | 338 | 27.2 | |
| Conservative | Tay-Jarl Andessen | 295 | 23.7 | |
| Majority | | | | |
| Turnout | | 1,244 | 28.1 | |
| Rejected ballots | | 23 | 1.8 | |
| Labour hold | | Swing | | |
| Labour hold | | Swing | | |

Stoughton (top 3 candidates elected)
| Party | Candidate | Votes | % | ±% |
|---|---|---|---|---|
| Liberal Democrats | Pauline Searle | 1,476 | 61.1 | |
| Liberal Democrats | Gillian Harwood | 1,431 | 59.2 | |
| Liberal Democrats | Masuk Miah | 1,317 | 54.5 | |
| Conservative | David Quelch | 574 | 23.7 | |
| Conservative | Philip Hooper | 513 | 21.2 | |
| Labour Co-op | Anne Rouse | 430 | 17.8 | |
| Labour Co-op | Shelley Grainger | 399 | 16.5 | |
| Conservative | Malachy Ujam | 377 | 15.6 | |
| Labour Co-op | Nick Trier | 337 | 13.9 | |
| Majority | | | | |
| Turnout | | 2,417 | 35.0 | |
| Rejected ballots | | 32 | 1.3 | |
| Liberal Democrats gain from Conservative | | Swing | | |
| Liberal Democrats hold | | Swing | | |
| Liberal Democrats hold | | Swing | | |

Tillingbourne (top 2 candidates elected)
| Party | Candidate | Votes | % | ±% |
|---|---|---|---|---|
| Conservative | Richard Billington | 825 | 49.8 | |
| Green | Diana Jones | 745 | 45.0 | |
| Conservative | David Wright | 734 | 44.3 | |
| Liberal Democrats | Liam O'Keefe | 679 | 41.0 | |
| Majority | | | | |
| Turnout | | 1,656 | 41.7 | |
| Rejected ballots | | 29 | 1.8 | |
| Conservative hold | | Swing | | |
| Green gain from Conservative | | Swing | | |

Westborough (top 3 candidates elected)
| Party | Candidate | Votes | % | ±% |
|---|---|---|---|---|
| Liberal Democrats | Julia McShane | 898 | 47.7 | |
| Liberal Democrats | Fiona White | 801 | 42.6 | |
| Liberal Democrats | James Steel | 779 | 41.4 | |
| Labour | Amanda Creese | 519 | 27.6 | |
| Labour | George Dokimakis | 493 | 26.2 | |
| Labour | Howard Smith | 468 | 24.9 | |
| Conservative | Liz Hooper | 311 | 16.5 | |
| Conservative | Sheila Kirkland | 311 | 16.5 | |
| Conservative | Alastair Knowles | 306 | 16.3 | |
| Peace | John Morris | 190 | 10.1 | |
| Peace | Valerie Drummond | 153 | 8.1 | |
| Peace | Frances Worpe | 116 | 6.2 | |
| Majority | | | | |
| Turnout | | 1,881 | 29.9 | |
| Rejected ballots | | 20 | 1.1 | |
| Liberal Democrats hold | | Swing | | |
| Liberal Democrats gain from Conservative | | Swing | | |
| Liberal Democrats gain from Conservative | | Swing | | |

Worplesdon (top 3 candidates elected) *
| Party | Candidate | Votes | % | ±% |
|---|---|---|---|---|
| R4GV | Bob McShee | 1,308 | 54.3 | |
| R4GV | Elizabeth McShee | 1,160 | 48.2 | |
| R4GV | Ruth Brothwell | 1,003 | 41.6 | |
| Conservative | David Elms | 803 | 33.3 | |
| Conservative | Keith Witham | 762 | 31.6 | |
| Conservative | Dennis Paul | 675 | 28.0 | |
| Liberal Democrats | Jonathan Edwards | 472 | 19.6 | |
| Labour | Ali Mirmak | 307 | 12.7 | |
| Labour | Dominic Stone | 295 | 12.2 | |
| Majority | | | | |
| Turnout | | 2,409 | 38.0 | |
| Rejected ballots | | 7 | 0.3 | |
| R4GV gain from Conservative | | Swing | | |
| R4GV gain from Conservative | | Swing | | |
| R4GV gain from Conservative | | Swing | | |

== Changes 2019–2023 ==
- 16 September 2019: Gordon Jackson (Pirbright), deputy leader of the Conservative group, resigned from the Conservative Party to sit as an independent councillor, after the government withdrew the whip from MPs (including Guildford's own MP) who had voted against a no-deal Brexit.
- 3 November 2021: Jan Harwood (Merrow), the Liberal Democrat deputy leader of the council, defected to the Conservatives.
- 4 July 2022: Jan Harwood (Merrow) left the Conservatives to sit as an independent councillor.
- 29 September 2022: Diana Jones (Tillingbourne), who had sat with the Residents for Guildford and Villages group since shortly after the 2019 election while remaining a Green Party councillor, left the group to sit as a Green Party councillor alone.
- 17 November 2022: Tony Rooth (Pilgrims) left the Residents for Guildford and Villages group to sit as an independent councillor.
- 4 April 2023: Paul Abbey (Ash South & Tongham) defected from the Residents for Guildford and Villages to the Liberal Democrats, having not been selected by R4GV to stand at the 2023 election.

=== By-elections ===
==== Friary & St Nicolas ====
Friary & St Nicolas: 6 May 2021
| Party | Candidate | Votes | % | ±% |
|---|---|---|---|---|
| Liberal Democrats | Cait Taylor | 1,056 | 39.2 | −19.7 |
| R4GV | Dom Frazer | 660 | 24.5 | −11.2 |
| Conservative | Sallie Barker | 548 | 20.3 | +4.2 |
| Labour | Jacob Allen | 430 | 16.0 | +1.0 |
| Majority | | | | |
| Turnout | | 2,694 | 39.6 | |
| Liberal Democrats hold | | Swing | | |

The by-election was triggered by the resignation of Liberal Democrat councillor Caroline Reeves, who had led the council through the first months of the COVID-19 pandemic before stepping down as leader in late 2020 and resigning her seat in early 2021.

==== Pirbright ====
Pirbright: 6 May 2021
| Party | Candidate | Votes | % | ±% |
|---|---|---|---|---|
| Conservative | Keith Witham | 440 | 60.8 | −6.6 |
| Green | Claire Whitehouse | 119 | 16.4 | N/A |
| R4GV | Gerry Lytle | 109 | 15.1 | N/A |
| Labour | Ali Mirmak | 56 | 7.7 | −3.1 |
| Majority | | | | |
| Turnout | | 724 | 34.5 | |
| Conservative hold | | Swing | | |

The vacancy arose from the resignation of Gordon Jackson, who had been elected for the Conservatives in 2019 but had sat as an independent councillor since September 2019.

==== Send ====
Send: 6 May 2021
| Party | Candidate | Votes | % | ±% |
|---|---|---|---|---|
| GGG | Guida Esteves | 851 | 52.4 | −23.1 |
| Conservative | Justin Offord | 500 | 30.8 | +8.7 |
| Green | Sam Peters | 206 | 12.7 | N/A |
| Labour | Charlotte Smith | 68 | 4.2 | −4.4 |
| Majority | | | | |
| Turnout | | 1,625 | 47.9 | |
| GGG hold | | Swing | | |

The by-election was called after the death of Guildford Greenbelt Group councillor Patrick Sheard.

==== Tillingbourne ====
Tillingbourne: 20 October 2022
| Party | Candidate | Votes | % | ±% |
|---|---|---|---|---|
| Liberal Democrats | Richard Morris | 636 | 46.5 | +5.5 |
| Conservative | Justin Offord | 293 | 21.4 | −28.4 |
| R4GV | Clare Price | 185 | 13.5 | N/A |
| Green | Sam Peters | 168 | 12.3 | −32.7 |
| Labour | John Marsh | 85 | 6.2 | N/A |
| Majority | | | | |
| Turnout | | 1,367 | | |
| Liberal Democrats gain from Conservative | | Swing | | |

The by-election followed the death in May 2022 of the former Mayor of Guildford and Conservative councillor Richard Billington.

== See also ==
- 2015 Guildford Borough Council election
- Guildford Borough Council elections
