= Guildford Greenbelt Group =

- Leader: Cllr. Pat Oven
- Founded: 2013; 12 years ago
- Registered: 2014; 11 years ago
- Headquarters: Guildford
- Ideology: Single-issue politics Green belt conservation
- Colours: Green
- House of Commons: 0 / 650
- Guildford Borough Council: 3 / 48

Website
- www.guildfordgreenbeltgroup.co.uk

The Guildford Greenbelt Group is a small political party within the United Kingdom which seeks to preserve the green belt surrounding Guildford in Surrey.

The group was founded in 2013 and the party was registered with the Electoral Commission in 2014.

== Electoral history ==
Its chair, Susan Parker, stood in Guildford in the 2015 general election coming in 6th place with 538 votes (1.0%)

Standing in some wards in the Borough of Guildford in the 2015 local elections, the party gained its first three councillors, and secured 20,614 votes across the borough. At the 2019 local elections the party increased its Borough Council representation to four seats.

In the 2023 local elections, the GGG lost one of their seats, bringing their total down to 3 for the 2023–2027 council term.

Guildford Borough Council
Year	Seats	+/-
2015	3 / 48	▲3
2019	4 / 48	▲1
2023	3 / 48	▼1
