= 1983 Guildford Borough Council election =

1983 UK local government election

The fourth full elections for Guildford Borough Council took place on 5 May 1983. The Conservatives retained control of the council winning 31 of the 45 seats on the council, this represented a net loss of three seats compared to the 1979 elections. The SDP-Liberal Alliance won 7 seats, a net gain of 4 seats compared to the 1979 council elections. Labour retained its 6 seats. Only 1 Independent was elected, one fewer than 1979.

If one disregards any change of seats from the Liberal Party to the SDP-Liberal Alliance, three wards wholly or partly changed party allegiance in the 1983 council election relative to the 1979 council election.

The SDP-Liberal Alliance gained a total of four councillors over two wards. They gained two councillors from the Conservatives in Friary & St Nicolas ward and gained a further two councillors from the Conservatives in Onslow ward.

The Conservatives gained one councillor from an independent in Lovelace ward.

== Results by ward ==
Ash (top 3 candidates elected)
Party	Candidate	Votes	%	±%
Conservative	John Ades	1720		
Conservative	Rosemary Hall	1601		
Conservative	Roy Arnett	1401		
Labour	Jean Curwell	705		
Labour	Peter Green	671		
Labour	Robert Knight	621		
Alliance	Jean Wickens	571		
Alliance	Daphne Dutton	544		
Alliance	Rosaleen Morgan	521		
Majority		696		
Conservative hold		Swing		
Conservative hold		Swing		
Conservative hold		Swing		

Ash Vale (top 2 candidates elected)
Party	Candidate	Votes	%	±%
Conservative	Joan Golding	966		
Conservative	Mary Lloyd-Jones	922		
Alliance	Richard Elder	477		
Alliance	Gilbert Molkenthin	465		
Labour	Andrew Winterbottom	182		
Labour	Cecil Philips	175		
Majority		445		
Conservative hold		Swing		
Conservative hold		Swing		

Christchurch (top 2 candidates elected)
Party	Candidate	Votes	%	±%
Conservative	Andrew Hodges	1325		
Conservative	Roger Majoribanks	1277		
Alliance	David Brown	525		
Alliance	Timothy Francis	399		
Labour	Margaret Rogers	152		
Labour	Malcolm Hill	184		
Majority		752		
Conservative hold		Swing		
Conservative hold		Swing		

Clandon & Horsley (top 3 candidates elected)
Party	Candidate	Votes	%	±%
Conservative	George Greenhead	2070		
Conservative	Douglas May	2017		
Conservative	Lewis Short	1962		
Alliance	Alan Ridler	668		
Alliance	Reginal Allen	586		
Alliance	Christopher Richards	580		
Labour	Terry Haines	225		
Labour	Alan Norman	190		
Labour	John Neate	184		
Majority		1294		
Conservative hold		Swing		
Conservative hold		Swing		
Conservative hold		Swing		

Effingham (only 1 candidate elected)
Party	Candidate	Votes	%	±%
Conservative	Anthony Page	622		
Alliance	Peter McCarthy	289		
Labour	Leslie McLaughlin	52		
Majority		333		
Conservative hold		Swing		

Friary & St. Nicolas (top 3 candidates elected)
Party	Candidate	Votes	%	±%
Liberal	Robert Blundell	1744		
Alliance	Charles St George	1663		
Alliance	Richard Marks	1653		
Conservative	Jean Harris	1197		
Conservative	Stanley Cobbett	1116		
Conservative	Leonard Boxall	1098		
Labour	Jill Chesterton	405		
Labour	Graham Walker	375		
Labour	Keith Horne	343		
Majority		456		
Liberal hold		Swing		
Alliance gain from Conservative		Swing		
Alliance gain from Conservative		Swing		

Holy Trinity (top 2 candidates elected)
Party	Candidate	Votes	%	±%
Conservative	Elizabeth Cobbett	1230		
Conservative	Anthony Allenby	1211		
Alliance	David Stokes	1019		
Alliance	Gorden Bridger	992		
Labour	Malcolm Corbett	173		
Labour	Susan Walker	150		
Majority		192		
Conservative hold		Swing		
Conservative hold		Swing		

Lovelace (only 1 candidate elected)
Party	Candidate	Votes	%	±%
Conservative	Jim Kennedy-Hawkes	415		
Alliance	Robert Parker	248		
Labour	Sydney Boulton	102		
Majority		167		
Conservative gain from Independent		Swing		

Merrow & Burpham (top 3 candidates elected)
Party	Candidate	Votes	%	±%
Conservative	Reg Beatrip	1996		
Conservative	Paul Johnson	1764		
Conservative	Marion Uniacke	1630		
Alliance	Gordon Hall	934		
Alliance	Susan Gross	910		
Alliance	Frank Kraus	799		
Labour	Michael Hornsby-Smith	545		
Labour	Cynthia Matthews	526		
Labour	Carole Sawyers	463		
Majority		696		
Conservative hold		Swing		
Conservative hold		Swing		
Conservative hold		Swing		

Normandy (only 1 candidate elected)
Party	Candidate	Votes	%	±%
Conservative	John Lockyer-Nibbs	445		
Independent	Doug Blackhurst	262		
	Pauline Hall	148		
Labour	Brian Mountain	104		
Majority		183		
Conservative hold		Swing		

Onslow (top 3 candidates elected)
Party	Candidate	Votes	%	±%
Alliance	Lynda Strudwick	1348		
Alliance	Antony Phillips	1201		
Conservative	Bernard Parke	1060		
Alliance	David Hopkins	1022		
Conservative	Kenneth Johns	1021		
Conservative	Brenda Woodhatch	984		
Labour	Jack Cox	444		
Labour	Carmel Rogers	410		
Labour	Graham Dinnage	357		
Majority		38		
Alliance gain from Conservative		Swing		
Alliance gain from Conservative		Swing		
Conservative hold		Swing		

Pilgrims (top 2 candidates elected)
Party	Candidate	Votes	%	±%
Conservative	Derek Pinks	941		
Conservative	Malcolm Williamson	929		
Alliance	Joceleyne Leppard	259		
Labour	Joseph Bullock	131		
Labour	Elizabeth Bullock	123		
Majority		670		
Conservative hold		Swing		
Conservative hold		Swing		

Pirbright (only 1 candidate elected)
Party	Candidate	Votes	%	±%
Conservative	Catherine Cobley	451		
Alliance	Halcyon Broadwood	173		
Labour	Susan Caroll	46		
Majority		278		
Conservative hold		Swing		

Send (top 2 candidates elected)
Party	Candidate	Votes	%	±%
Conservative	Geoffrey Smith	980		
Conservative	Keith Taylor	970		
Liberal	Anne Lambe	474		
Liberal	Leslie McCarthy	361		
Labour	Mel Beynon	143		
Majority		496		
Conservative hold		Swing		
Conservative hold		Swing		

Shalford (only 1 candidate elected)
Party	Candidate	Votes	%	±%
Conservative	Sarah Stewart	901		
Liberal	Len Grugeon	395		
Labour	Harold Richards	154		
Majority		506		
Conservative hold		Swing		

Stoke (top 3 candidates elected)
Party	Candidate	Votes	%	±%
Labour	Bill Bellerby	2246		
Labour	Ron Burgess	1743		
Labour	Sallie Thornberry	1502		
Conservative	Robert Gregory	572		
Conservative	Amelia Harris	489		
Conservative	Philip Hooper	465		
Liberal	Margaret Goldstone	446		
Alliance	Graham Maynard	220		
Alliance	John Leppard	197		
Majority		930		
Labour hold		Swing		
Labour hold		Swing		
Labour hold		Swing		

Stoughton (top 3 candidates elected)
Party	Candidate	Votes	%	±%
Liberal	Chris Fox	1628		
Liberal	Patrick Goldstone	1415		
Conservative	Ralph Jordan	1211		
Alliance	David Newman	1128		
Conservative	Leslie Max	1056		
Conservative	Roy Proce	980		
Labour	Philip Cole	471		
Labour	Jeremy Dale	408		
Labour	Norma Hedger	386		
Majority		83		
Liberal hold		Swing		
Liberal hold		Swing		
Conservative hold		Swing		

Tillingbourne (top 2 candidates elected)
Party	Candidate	Votes	%	±%
Conservative	Barbara Pattman	998		
Independent	Margaret Elston	971		
Conservative	Heidi Macnair	690		
	John Elinger	589		
Alliance	Diane Donne	571		
Labour	Hilary Cole	91		
Labour	Janet Daburn	82		
Majority		281		
Conservative hold		Swing		
Independent hold		Swing		

Tongham (only 1 candidate elected)
Party	Candidate	Votes	%	±%
Conservative	Percy Davies	396		
Labour	William Owen	223		
Majority		173		
Conservative hold		Swing		

Westborough (top 3 candidates elected)
Party	Candidate	Votes	%	±%
Labour	Doreen Bellerby	1622		
Labour	Jack Patrick	1391		
Labour	John Woodhatch	1288		
Alliance	Deborah Boyd	669		
Conservative	Frank Wood	650		
Alliance	Pamela Palmer	649		
Conservative	Jonathan Hallet-Lukes	646		
Alliance	Kenneth Briggs	640		
Majority		619		
Labour hold		Swing		
Labour hold		Swing		
Labour hold		Swing		

Worplesdon (top 3 candidates elected)
Party	Candidate	Votes	%	±%
Conservative	Clare Griffin	1431		
Conservative	Peter Hodgkins	1408		
Conservative	Bernard Williams	1306		
Alliance	Arthur Croker	866		
Liberal	Peter Stokoe	830		
Alliance	John Hutt	742		
Labour	Florence Flynn	235		
Labour	Joan O'Bryne	232		
Labour	Michael O'Bryne	212		
Majority		440		
Conservative hold		Swing		
Conservative hold		Swing		
Conservative hold		Swing		
