= Residents for Guildford and Villages =

- Leader: Joss Bigmore
- Founded: 2019
- Headquarters: Guildford
- Ideology: Localism; Nonpartisan politics
- Colours: Magenta & White
- Surrey County Council: 2 / 81
- Guildford Borough Council: 7 / 48

Website
- r4gv.org.uk

Residents for Guildford and Villages (R4GV) is a political party based in Guildford. The party was formed in early 2019 to contest the 2019 Guildford Borough Council election, and became the second largest party on the Guildford Borough Council, after winning 15 seats out of 48. In the 2023 Guildford Borough Council election, R4GV became the third largest party after winning only 7 seats, a decrease of 8.

The party campaigns for changes to the Local Plan and on environmental issues.

== History ==
The party was originally launched in January 2019, presenting itself as a residents' group that aimed to support independent candidates running for Guildford Borough Council on a broadly aligned campaign platform, but it was later formally registered as a political party in March 2019.

In May 2019, R4GV contested the Guildford Borough Council elections, standing 17 candidates and winning 15 seats. Following this result, they formed an administration with the Liberal Democrats, and in October 2020, party leader Joss Bigmore became Leader of Guildford Borough Council, serving until September 2022 when the role was handed back to the Liberal Democrats.

R4GV also unsuccessfully contested the Friary and St Nicolas by-election and the Pirbright by-election to the borough council as part of the 2021 local elections, and unsuccessfully contested the 2022 Tillingbourne by-election to the borough council. In the 2021 Surrey County Council election, the party gained two county councillors.

In the 2023 local elections, although garnering almost the same number of votes as 2019, the party lost 8 of their 15 seats, bringing their total down to 7 seats and becoming an opposition party for the 2023–2027 term.

== Electoral history ==
=== Guildford Borough Council elections ===
Election	Votes		Total	
Election	No.	%	No.	±
2019	20,488	23.2	15 / 48	▲15
2023	20,297	23.21	7 / 48	▼8

Friary and St Nicolas By-election 6 May 2021
Party	Candidate	Votes	%	±%
R4GV	Dom Frazer	660	24.3	
Turnout		2712	39.6	
Liberal Democrats hold		Swing		

Pirbright By-election 6 May 2021
Party	Candidate	Votes	%	±%
R4GV	Gerry Lytle	109	14.9	
Turnout		731	34.5	
Conservative hold		Swing		

Tillingbourne By-election 20 October 2022
Party	Candidate	Votes	%	±%
R4GV	Clare Price	185	13.5	
Turnout		1370	31	
Liberal Democrats gain from Conservative		Swing		

=== Surrey County Council elections ===
In the 2021 Surrey County Council elections R4GV stood in six of the ten county seats within Guildford borough and won two of them.

Election	Votes		Total	
Election	No.	%	No.	±
2021	6,510	2	2 / 81	▲2
