= Horsley Towers =

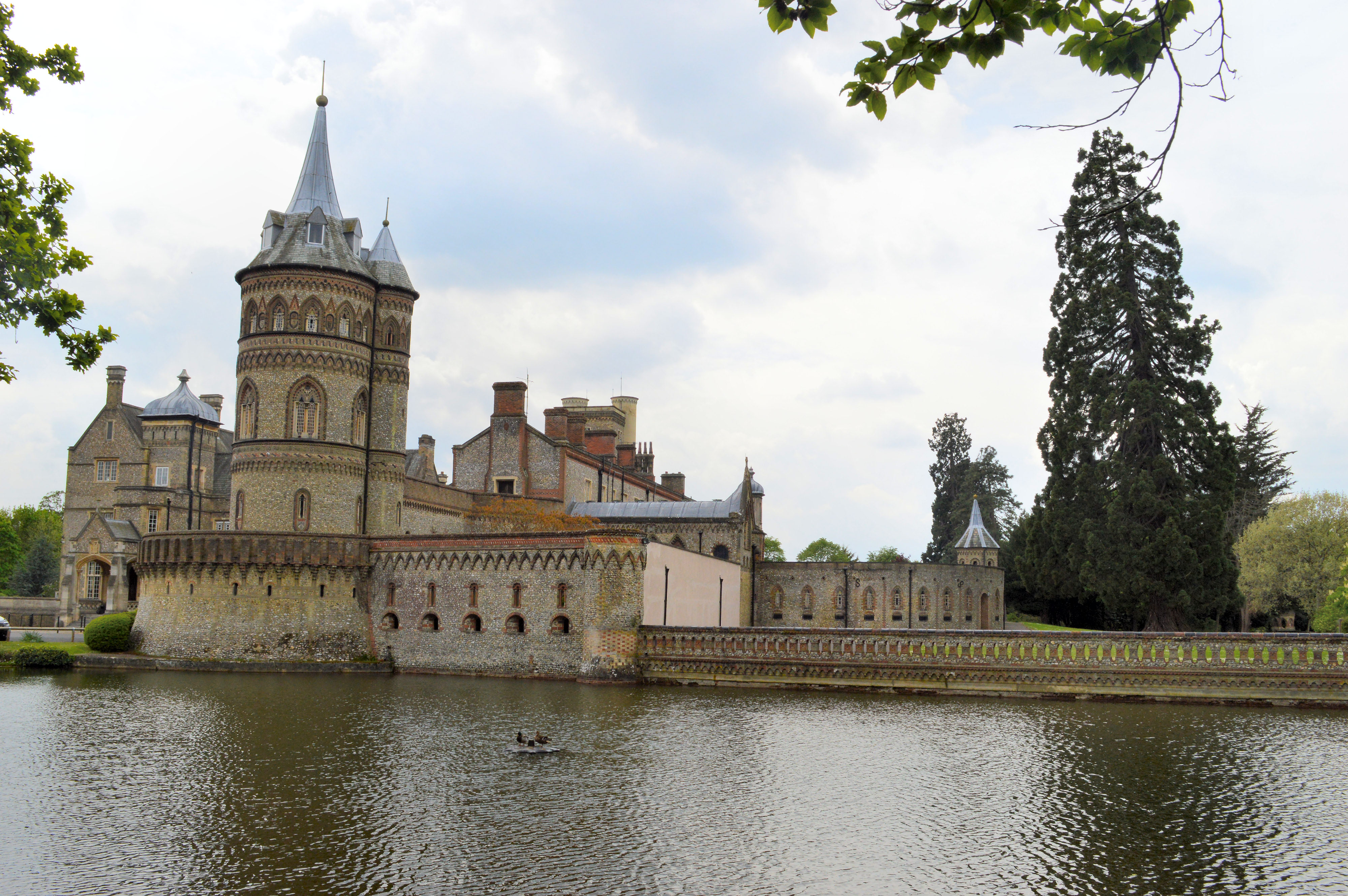
- Horsley Towers seen across the lake

- Location within Surrey
- 51°15′55″N 0°25′38″W
- Type: House
- Location: East Horsley, Surrey

History
- Built: 1834, 1855-60

Site notes
- Architect(s): Charles Barry, William King-Noel, 1st Earl of Lovelace
- Architectural styles: Tudor Revival, Romanesque Revival
- Governing body: De Vere (hotel operator)

Listed Building – Grade II*
- Official name: Horsley Towers
- Designated: 14 June 1967
- Reference no.: 1294810

Listed Building – Grade II
- Official name: Entrance Walls, Gardeners Cottage and Horsley Towers Cottage
- Designated: 25 November 1985
- Reference no.: 1029424

Listed Building – Grade II
- Official name: Pavilion 100 yards northwest of cloisters of Horsley Towers
- Designated: 25 November 1985
- Reference no.: 1029425

Listed Building – Grade II
- Official name: Wall and Pavilion 300 yards southwest of Horsley Towers
- Designated: 25 November 1985
- Reference no.: 1188298

Listed Building – Grade II
- Official name: Walls to former kitchen garden of Horsley Towers
- Designated: 25 November 1985
- Reference no.: 1377818

Horsley Towers, East Horsley, Surrey, England is a country house dating from the 19th century. The house was designed by Charles Barry for the banker William Currie. The East Horsley estate was later sold to William King-Noel, 1st Earl of Lovelace who undertook two major expansions of the house to his own designs. Lovelace lived at the Towers with his wife, Ada, daughter of Lord Byron, a pioneering mathematician, friend of Charles Babbage and described as among the first computer programmers. In 1919, the Towers was purchased by Thomas Sopwith, the aviator and businessman, who named his plane, the Hawker Horsley, after his home. Now a hotel, wedding and conference venue set in parkland with a total area of about 50 acres, Horsley Towers is a Grade II* listed building.

== History ==
William Currie was a banker and distiller, who had inherited a substantial fortune from his father, on the latter's death in 1781. In 1820, Currie engaged Charles Barry to replace the existing Georgian manor house on his East Horsley estate. It was an early commission for Barry, then aged 25, who opened the London office of his architectural practice only in 1821. Following Currie's death in 1829, the Horsley estate was bought by William King, who was raised in the peerage to Earl of Lovelace in 1838 and served as Lord Lieutenant of Surrey from 1840 until his death in 1893. King had married Augusta Ada Byron, Lord Byron's only legitimate offspring in 1833.

Lovelace, who began his career as a diplomat, turned to scientific investigation and engineering after inheriting his title. A roof truss in the great hall he designed at Horsley carries an inscription recording that Lovelace had moulded the beam with the use of steam. Ada gained even greater prominence for her scientific endeavours; through her friendship with Charles Babbage she wrote a commentary on his analytical engine, arguably the earliest mechanical computer. Her commentary has been described as containing "one of the earliest computer programmes".

In 1919 the third earl sold the East Horsley estate to Thomas Sopwith, the aviator and businessman for £150,000. While resident at the Towers, Sopwith named one of his aircraft, the Hawker Horsley, after the house. After World War II, the house was purchased by the Electricity Council for use as a management training college. It is now a wedding and conference venue operated by De Vere.

== Architecture and description ==
Pevsner describes the approach to the Towers as "one of the most sensational in England". The core of the present house is Barry's building of 1820–1829, undertaken in the Tudor Revival style. This is enveloped with a great hall, built by Lovelace in 1849, and by even larger flanking towers, in Romanesque and Rhenish styles, and a chapel, all dating from 1859 and after, and drawing inspiration from a long European tour Lovelace undertook following Ada's death in 1852. The whole is encircled by a complex of walls, tunnels, arches, bastions and a lengthy cloister. (Note: Lovelace had a particular fondness for tunnels and bridges, constructing a complex of fifteen such structures, the Lovelace Bridges, on his wider East Horsley Estate.) The construction materials are mainly local flint and brick, Lovelace purchasing a brickworks at Ockham to ensure a ready supply.

Horsley Towers is a Grade II* listed building. The flanking walls and pavilions to the northwest and southwest, the entrance walls and lodges, one of which Nairn describes as "particularly violent", (Note: John Julius Norwich recorded his impressions of the lodge in his Architecture of Southern England; "The first sight of that tremendous Neo-Norman two-storey entrance lodge is enough to send your car into the ditch".) and the walls to the former kitchen garden, all have their own Grade II listings.

Neither Barry nor Lovelace's efforts have been much appreciated by critics. The Victorian Web notes that "the building, like much Victorian gothic, displays a good deal of eccentricity and mixes many styles". Ian Nairn, the main author of the Surrey Pevsner, wrote of Barry's Tudor Revival house; "a sober, dull design with the [...] lack of enthusiasm which taints so many of Barry's non-Classical buildings". (Note: Nairn's lasting impression of the house and of Lovelace was one of sadness; "sad that such an inventive engineering talent thought of architecture as something to be added on to structure, not to grow inevitably out of it".) Of Lovelace's work, Mark Girouard, the architectural historian, described the "extraordinary embellishments, in flint and polychrome brick made by the Earl, working to his own designs". The writer John Julius Norwich considered the whole "a grotesque Victorian Disneyland which has to be seen to be believed – and may not be even then", concluding that, unusually, his inclusion of Horsley Towers in his study The Architecture of Southern England, should serve as a warning rather than an inducement.

== Gallery ==
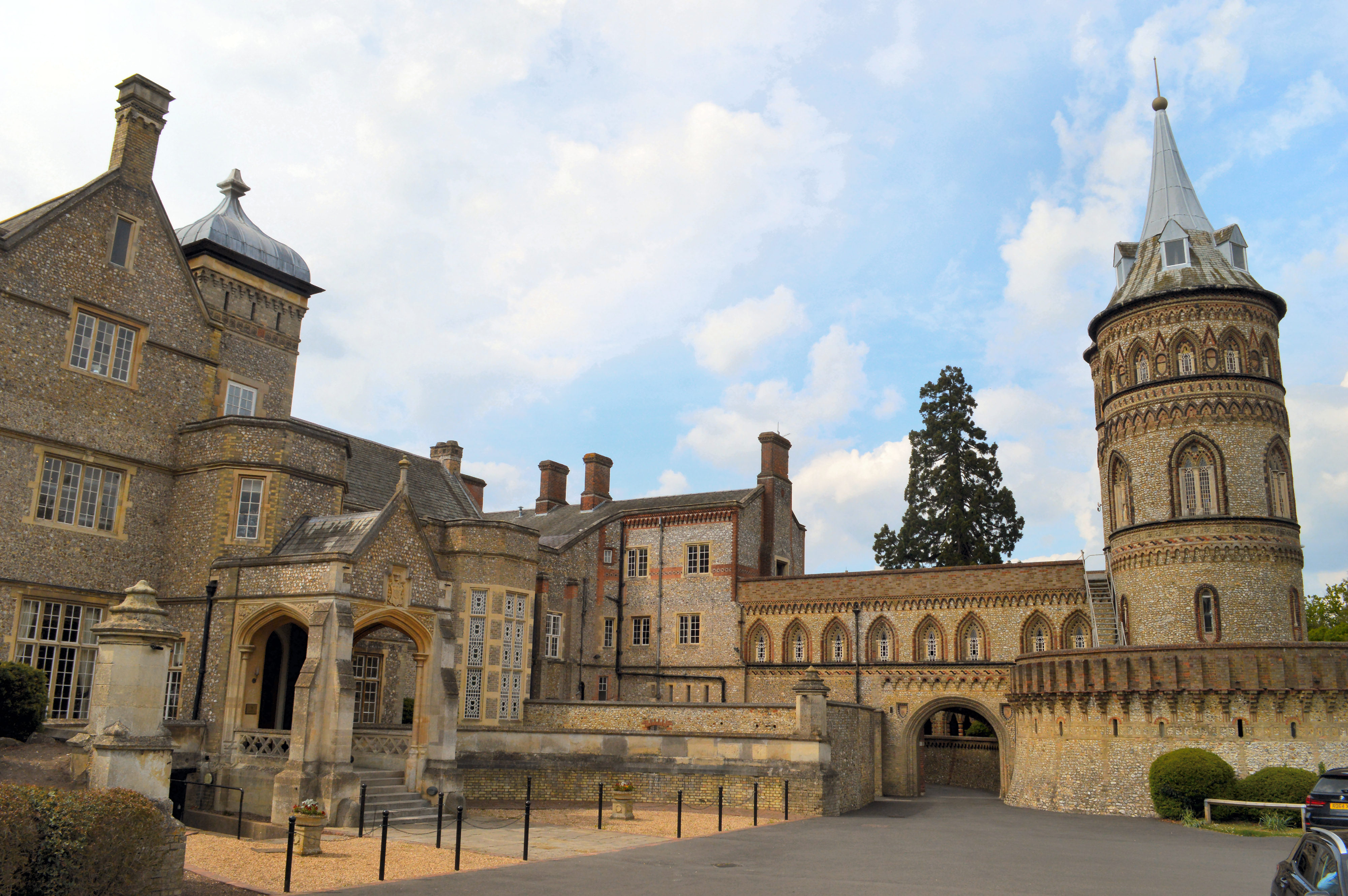
The entrance front – Pevsner called the approach to the house "one of the most sensational in England"

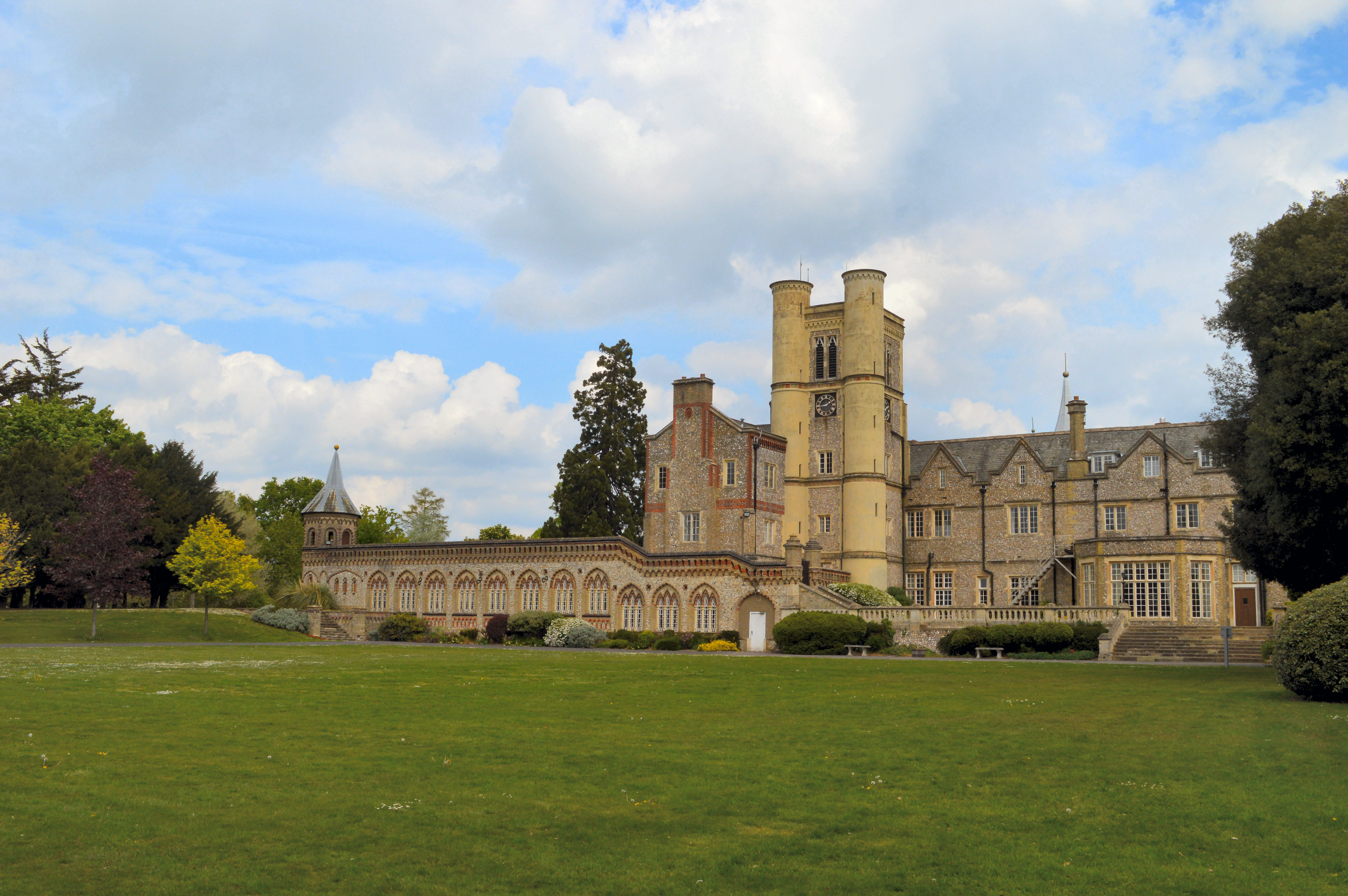
View from across the lawn – the Victorian Web described Lovelace's Romanesque tower as "a church tower to which someone has attached cylinders"

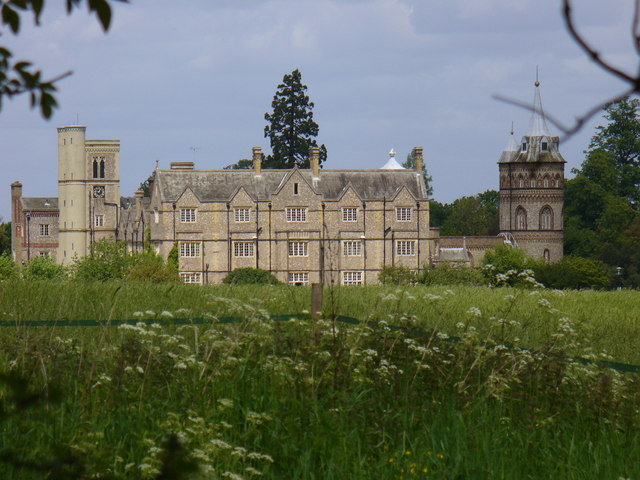
The rear frontage of the house – the central block is by Barry, the towers Lovelace's additions

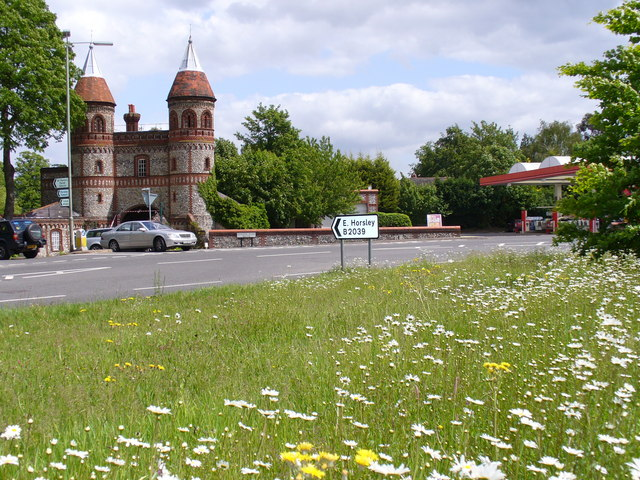
A view of one of the gatehouses, the design of which Ian Nairn described as "particularly violent"

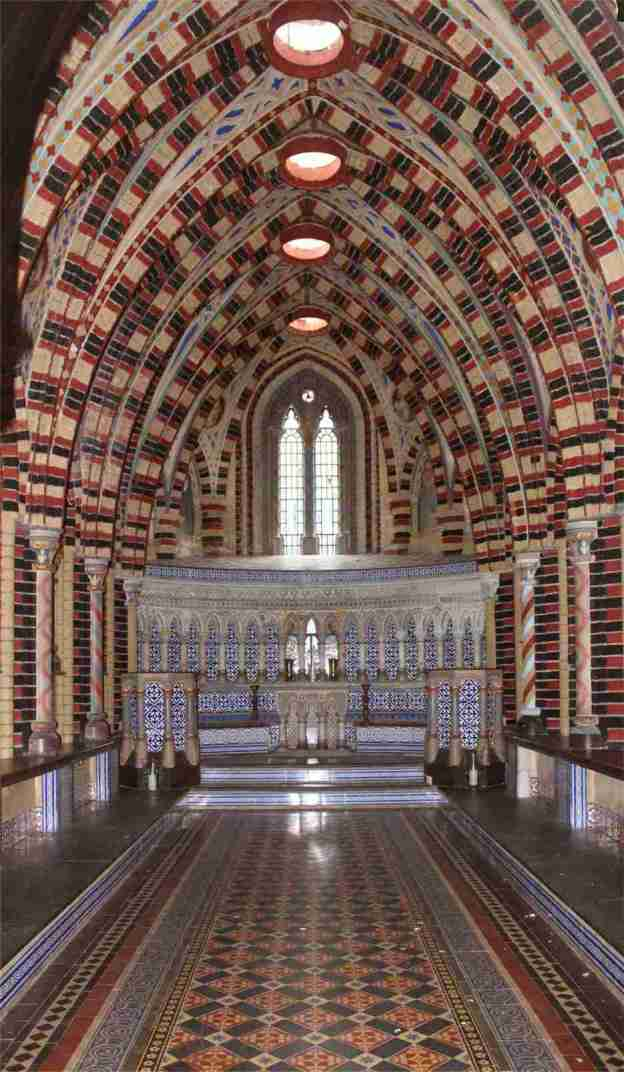
Horsley Towers – the Church inside the Tower building

== Sources ==
- Brodie, Antonia; Felstead, Alison; Franklin, Jonathan; Pinfield, Leslie; Oldfield, Jane (2001). Directory of British Architects 1834–1914 Volume 1:A-K. London: RIBA. ISBN 9780826449634. OCLC 491544613.
- Girouard, Mark (1979). The Victorian Country House. New Haven, US: Yale University Press. ISBN 9780300023909.
- Nairn, Ian; Pevsner, Nikolaus; Cherry, Bridget (1971). Surrey. The Buildings of England. Middlesex, England: Penguin Books. ISBN 0-300-09675-5.
- Norwich, John Julius (1985). The Architecture of Southern England. London: Macmillan. ISBN 9780333220375. OCLC 473443897.
- Robertson, Bruce (1970). Sopwith: The man and his aircraft. Letchworth, UK: Air Review Ltd. OCLC 156428.
