= William Currie (British politician) =

English businessman and Member of Parliament (1756–1829)

- Portrait of a Man, probably William Currie, 1756–1829, MP, painting by Nathaniel Dance-Holland, c.1790.

Member of Parliament for Winchelsea
- In office 1796–1802
- Preceded by: John Hiley Addington
- Succeeded by: Robert Ladbroke

Member of Parliament for Gatton
- In office 1790–1796
- Preceded by: William Mayne, 1st Baron Newhaven
- Succeeded by: Sir Gilbert Heathcote, 4th Baronet

Personal details
- Born: 26 February 1756
- Died: 3 June 1829 (aged 73)
- Spouse: Percy Gore (m. 1794)
- Relatives: Henry Currie (son); Frederick Currie (nephew); Mark John Currie (nephew); Raikes Currie (nephew)

An armorial hatchment with the coat of arms of William Currie (1756-1829), displaying his arms impaling the paternal arms of his wife, Percy Gore, 1829.

William Currie (26 February 1756 – 3 June 1829) was an English land owner, distiller, banker and Member of Parliament for Gatton and Winchelsea.

On his father's death in 1781, he inherited his father's 75% interest in the distilling partnership his father had started with Nathaniel Byles. He also became a partner in the family banking firm, replacing his father, but seems to have taken no active part, leaving the responsibilities to his brother Isaac.

In 1792, Currie was elected as a member of the American Philosophical Society in Philadelphia.

He is chiefly remembered for the restoration of the village of East Horsley and its manor house, East Horsley Towers.

== Family ==
He was the eldest son of William Currie (1721–1781) and Magdalen Lefevre (a great aunt of Charles Shaw-Lefevre, 1st Viscount Eversley), and was baptised at the Church of St. Dunstan's in Stepney on 4 March 1756.

Currie married Percy Gore on 23 June 1794, the daughter of a banking partner, by whom he had a daughter, Percy Gore Currie, and two sons, William and Henry. Percy Gore Currie married the Right Reverend Horatio Powys, son of Thomas Powys, 2nd Baron Lilford. The eldest son, William, was a great connoisseur and collector of works of art, and had excellent taste. He left his major collection of gems, cameos, intaglios, Etruscan scarab amulets, and Etruscan gold ornaments to the Uffizi Gallery in Florence. The second son, Henry, went on to be MP for Guildford between 1847 and 1852.

Three of his nephews were Sir Frederick Currie, 1st Baronet, Vice Admiral Mark John Currie and Raikes Currie, Member of Parliament for Northampton.

== East Horsley ==
Currie bought a substantial property, Horsley Towers, at East Horsley, in 1784 although it was not until 1820 that he commissioned Sir Charles Barry to build a second manor house in the Elizabethan style on the site. In 1792, an inclosure act enabled him to enclose most of Horsley Common at the northern end of the parish and the common fields and waste at the southern part. He created an open park, grubbing up hedges, but leaving trees standing and planting others. He restored the church of St Martin, established a school and improved or rebuilt most of the houses in the village. "He fortunately had opportunities of purchasing nearly all the other land in the parish; and happily for himself, his family, and all the inhabitants of the parish, he had the means with which to make those purchases. We say happily for the inhabitants of the parish, for a more benevolent man, and family, never blessed a village or neighbourhood."

Subsequent owners of the East Horsley estate were the 1st Earl of Lovelace, whose wife was Ada Lovelace, the computer pioneer and Lord Byron's daughter, and Sir Thomas Sopwith, the founder of the Sopwith Aviation Company, which featured predominantly in the First World War. After that war, the estate was broken up and sold in lots.

== Member of Parliament ==
Currie was returned in 1790 as Member of Parliament for Gatton. He continued there until the 1796 election, when he was returned for Winchelsea until 1802.

Gatton and Winchelsea were rotten boroughs and Gatton was an extreme example. It returned two MPs to the House of Commons, but only two constituents were entitled to vote, one of whom was William's brother, Mark Currie, the owner of Upper Gatton Park. Winchelsea also returned two MPs to Westminster, but had seven voters.

In Parliament, Currie made no known speech. He was in favour of the unsuccessful attempt to repeal the Test Act in Scotland in 1791 and voted with the opposition in the Oczakov debates of 12 April 1791 and 12 March 1792, but appears to have become a supporter of the administration afterwards. He voted for Pitt's assessed taxes on 4 January 1798, but made no further mark in the House, although on 9 December 1801 he was appointed to the Committee on East India judicature.

Parliament of Great Britain
Preceded by James Fraser; The Lord Newhaven	Member of Parliament for Gatton; 1790–1796; With: John Nesbitt	Succeeded by Sir Gilbert Heathcote, Bt; John Petrie
Preceded by John Hiley Addington; Richard Barwell	Member of Parliament for Winchelsea; 1796–1800; With: Richard Barwell to December 1796; William Devaynes from December 1796	Succeeded by Parliament of The United Kingdom
Parliament of the United Kingdom
Preceded by Parliament of Great Britain	Member of Parliament for Winchelsea; 1801–1802; With: William Devaynes	Succeeded by William Moffat; Robert Ladbroke
