= East Horsley =

Village and parish in Surrey, England

Coordinates: 51°15′40″N 0°25′59″W

- Village and civil parish
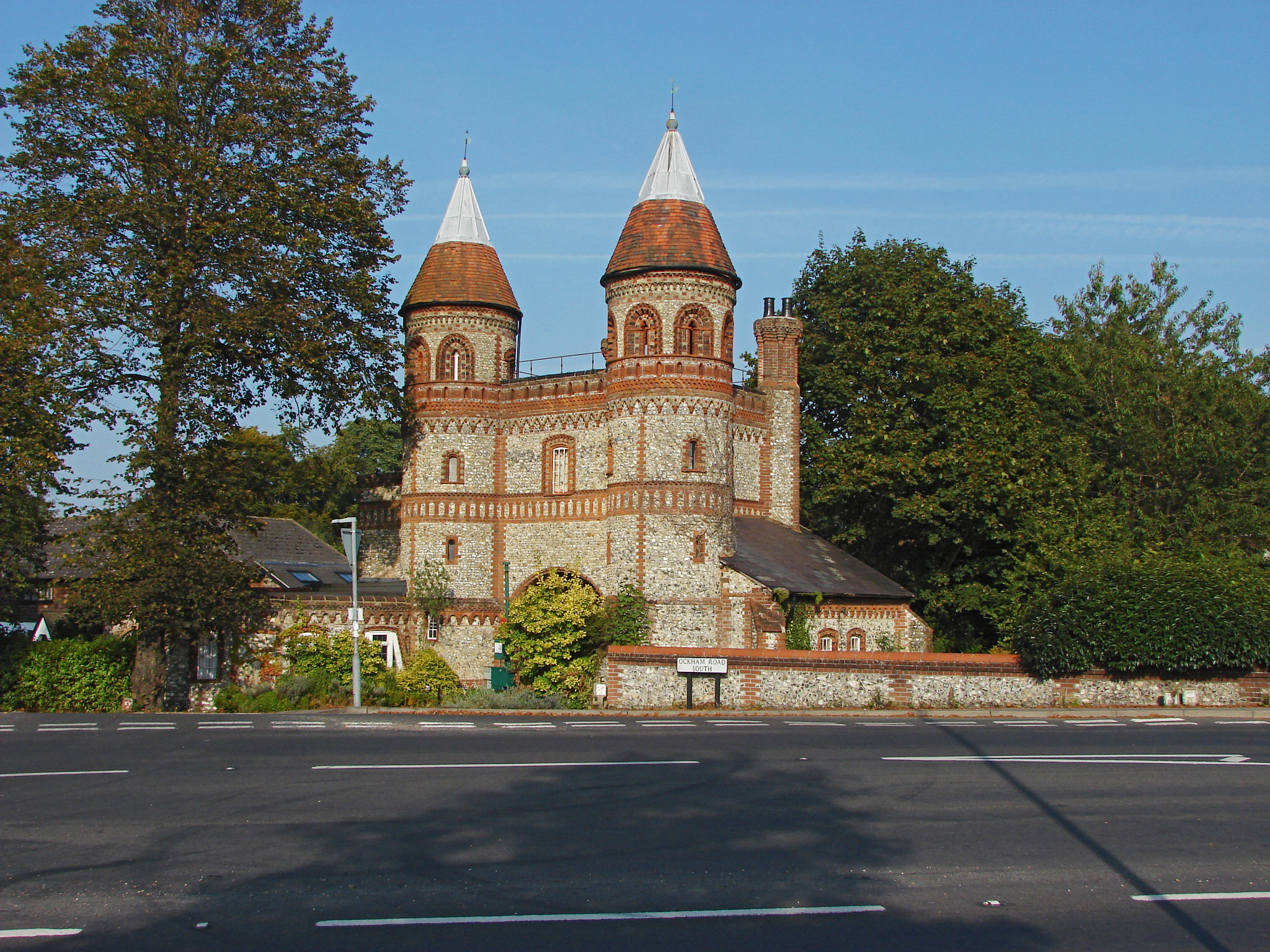
- Former gatehouse to Horsley Towers

- Location within Surrey
- Area: 7.4 km^{2} (2.9 sq mi)
- Population: 4,290 (Civil Parish 2011)
  - Density: 580/km^{2} (1,500/sq mi)
- OS grid reference: TQ0952
- Civil parish: East Horsley
- District: Guildford
- Shire county: Surrey
- Region: South East
- Country: England
- Sovereign state: United Kingdom
- Post town: Leatherhead
- Postcode district: KT24
- Dialling code: 01483
- Police: Surrey
- Fire: Surrey
- Ambulance: South East Coast
- UK Parliament: Guildford

East Horsley is a village and civil parish in Surrey, England, 21 miles southwest of London, on the A246 between Leatherhead and Guildford. Horsley and Effingham Junction railway stations are on the New Guildford line to London Waterloo. The two-halves of ancient Horsley are similar in having substantial woodland and some chalky lower slopes, in the south, of the North Downs.

== History ==
=== Manors ===
East Horsley appears in Domesday Book of 1086 as having two manors, listed under the chief manor's heading of Horslei. This was held by Lanfranc, Archbishop of Canterbury. Its domesday assets were: 3 hides and 1½ virgates; 8½ ploughs, woodland worth 50 hogs. It rendered £5 per year to its overlords.

The Bishop's Manor in East Horsley seems to have belonged to the see of Exeter throughout the Middle Ages. Malden writing in 1911 associates closely the Domesday entry in Latin meaning 'Bishop Osborn of Exeter holds Woking' with this manor which his successors later held, since there is no trace of any land held by the Bishop of Exeter in Woking in pipe rolls, Assize Rolls, feet of fines or the records of Lambeth Palace.

=== Enclosure and development ===
East Horsley Inclosure Act 1800
- Act of Parliament
- Parliament of Great Britain
- Long title: An Act for separating the Commons or Waste Grounds of the Manor of East Horseley, in the County of Surrey, which lie in the several Parishes of East Horseley and Ockham, within the said Manor, and for fettling the Rights of Common thereon.
- Citation: 39 & 40 Geo. 3. c. 11 Pr.
- Territorial extent: Great Britain

Dates
- Royal assent: 4 April 1800
- Commencement: 4 April 1800 (Note: The Acts of Parliament (Commencement) Act 1793.)

Status: Current legislation

The East Horsley Inclosure Act 1800 (39 & 40 Geo. 3. c. 11 Pr.) enabled William Currie MP to inclose most of Horsley Common at the northern end of the parish and the common fields and waste at the southern part, very much on the chalk. The parsonage and glebe were at the same time moved within the parish.

The village is the site of Horsley Towers, a gothic mansion designed by Sir Charles Barry (later the architect of the Houses of Parliament) for William Currie in place of an earlier building. Currie, a distiller and banker, had bought the property in 1784 and over the next 44 years made extensive changes to the village, including rebuilding most of its houses, establishing the school and restoring the church.

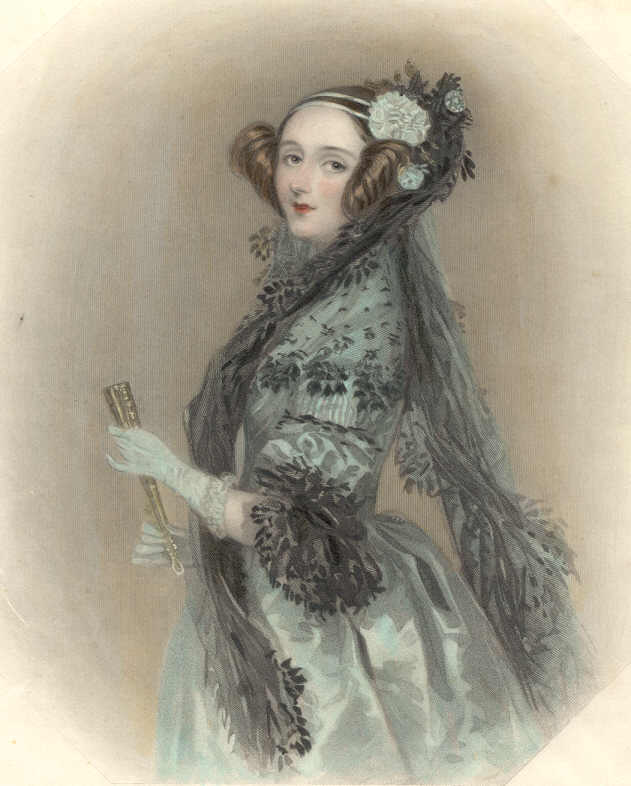
Ada, Lady Lovelace (writer, mathematician, and what we might call today a "computer programmer") lived at Horsley Towers

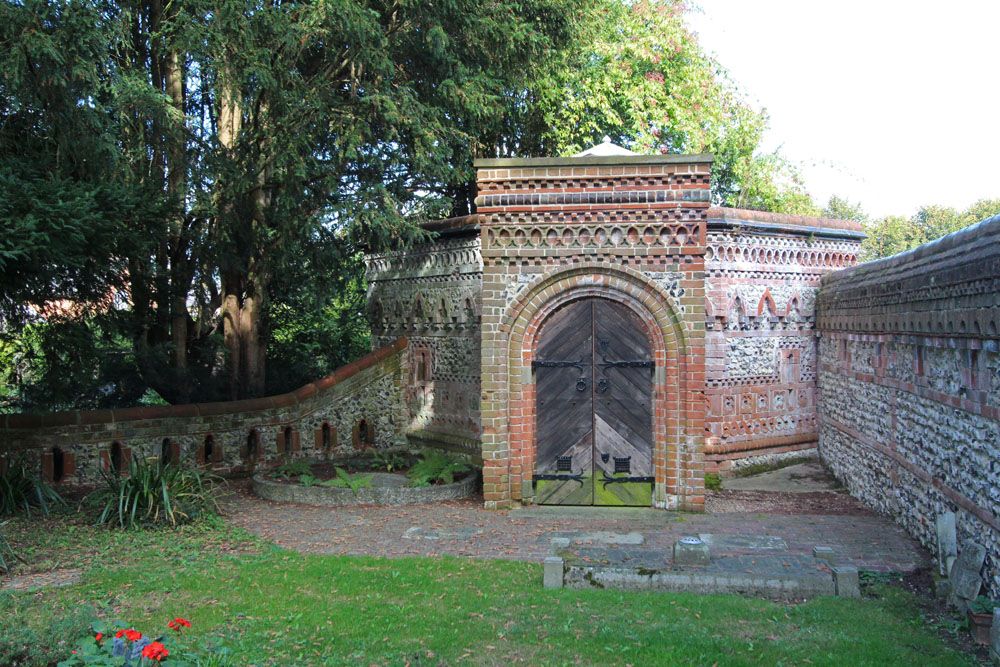
The 1st Earl of Lovelace's Mausoleum in the churchyard of Martin's Church, East Horsley

After Currie's death in 1829, the property was acquired by the 1st Earl of Lovelace (1805–1893). It was the marital home of Ada, Lady Lovelace (the writer, mathematician and what today we would call a "computer programmer"). The 1st Earl of Lovelace had fifteen bridges, known as the Lovelace Bridges, constructed on his estate to facilitate the transport of timber by horse-drawn carts. The bridges were built where the tracks crossed existing bridleways or roads. Ten bridges still exist.

In the early 1900s, the 3rd Earl of Lovelace applied restrictive covenants on most of his former fields when selling these to private developers, leading to the overwhelming proportion of homes being detached. No minimum plot size is specified, and planning is controlled by Guildford Borough Council, subject to advice from the local Horsley council.

Horsley Towers was also the home of Sir Thomas Sopwith, the aviation pioneer.

== Geography ==
The settlement is 21 miles southwest of London, partly on the A246 between Leatherhead and Guildford. As such it forms a cross between a nucleated village and dispersed settlement directly north of this road, with a wide array of medium-sized individual home plots typically of 0.4 acres (0.16 ha). Horsley and Effingham Junction railway stations are on the New Guildford line in the parish (connected to London Waterloo and both have a line direct to Leatherhead and Epsom).

The village has the parade of shops and businesses of the two Horsleys (see West Horsley), Otherwise the two halves of ancient Horsley are similar in having substantial woodland and some chalky lower slopes, in the south, of the North Downs.

== Amenities ==
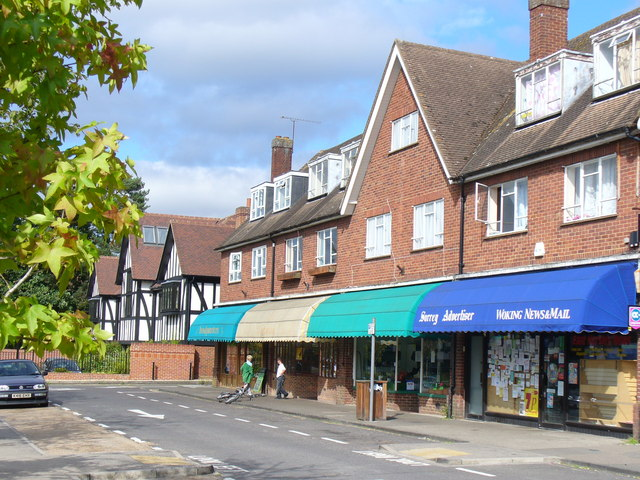
Facing this parade is another which is timber-framed creating diversity in the village's shops with homes above

Shops and businesses

The main row of shops is near the western railway station on a local thoroughfare from the end of Forest Road towards Ockham, a small number of professions operate here, such as accountants, opticians and the NHS medical practice. A Legacy hotel is in the village.

The medieval church, St Martin's, is part of the Diocese of Guildford.

The Nomad Theatre is a well-equipped amateur production stage which is behind the smaller of East Horsley's two rows of shops, Bishopsmead Parade. Its construction was largely financed by National Lottery grants from Arts Council England. The theatre opened in October 1998 with a production of Dylan Thomas's Under Milk Wood.

== Demography and housing ==
East Horsley had 1,343 detached homes (of which 1,309 were inhabited) and fewer than 183 of any other dwelling types at the 2011 census, and a high proportion of business-owners and directors, accordingly it was deemed Britain's "richest village" by The Daily Telegraph in 2011 and again in 2015.

2011 Census Homes (inhabited)
Output area	Detached	Semi-detached	Terraced	Flats and apartments	Caravan/temporary/mobile home	Shared between households
East Horsley (CP)	1,309	151	50	183	4	0

The average level of accommodation in the region composed of detached houses was 28%, the average that was apartments was 22.6%.

2011 Census Key Statistics
Output area	Population	Households	% Owned outright	% Owned with a loan	hectares
East Horsley (CP)	4,290	1,697	51.8	35.4	740

The proportion of households in East Horsley who owned their home outright was 19.3% above the regional average. The proportion who owned their home with a loan was 0.3% greater than the regional average; providing overall a lower proportion than average of rented residential property relative to the average in Surrey, the district and the country.

2011 Economic groups – National Statistics Socio-economic Classification
Output area	Higher Managerial, Administrative and Professional Occupations	Lower Managerial, Administrative and Professional Occupations	Intermediate Occupations	Small Employers and Own Account Workers	Lower Supervisory and Technical Occupations	Semi-Routine Occupations	Routine Occupations	Never worked or long-term unemployed	Full-time students
East Horsley (CP)	737	893	376	310	93	149	80	51	205

== Politics ==
Local government is administered by Guildford Borough Council and Surrey County Council.

At Surrey County Council, one of the 81 representatives represents the area within the Horsleys division.

At Guildford Borough Council the ward of the borough is represented by three councillors.

Guildford Borough Councillors
Election	Member	Ward
May 2015	Matthew Sarti	Clandon and Horsley (formerly: Lovelace)
May 2015	Jenny Wicks	Clandon and Horsley (formerly: Lovelace)
May 2015	David Reeve	Clandon and Horsley (formerly: Lovelace)

Surrey County Councillor
Election	Member	Electoral Division
2013	W.D. 'Bill' Barker	Horsleys

East Horsley is in Guildford parliamentary constituency.

== Neighbouring areas ==
Neighbouring areas are:

== See also ==
- List of places of worship in Guildford (borough)
