= Peter King, 7th Baron King =

English writer (1775-1833)

The Right Honourable The Lord King
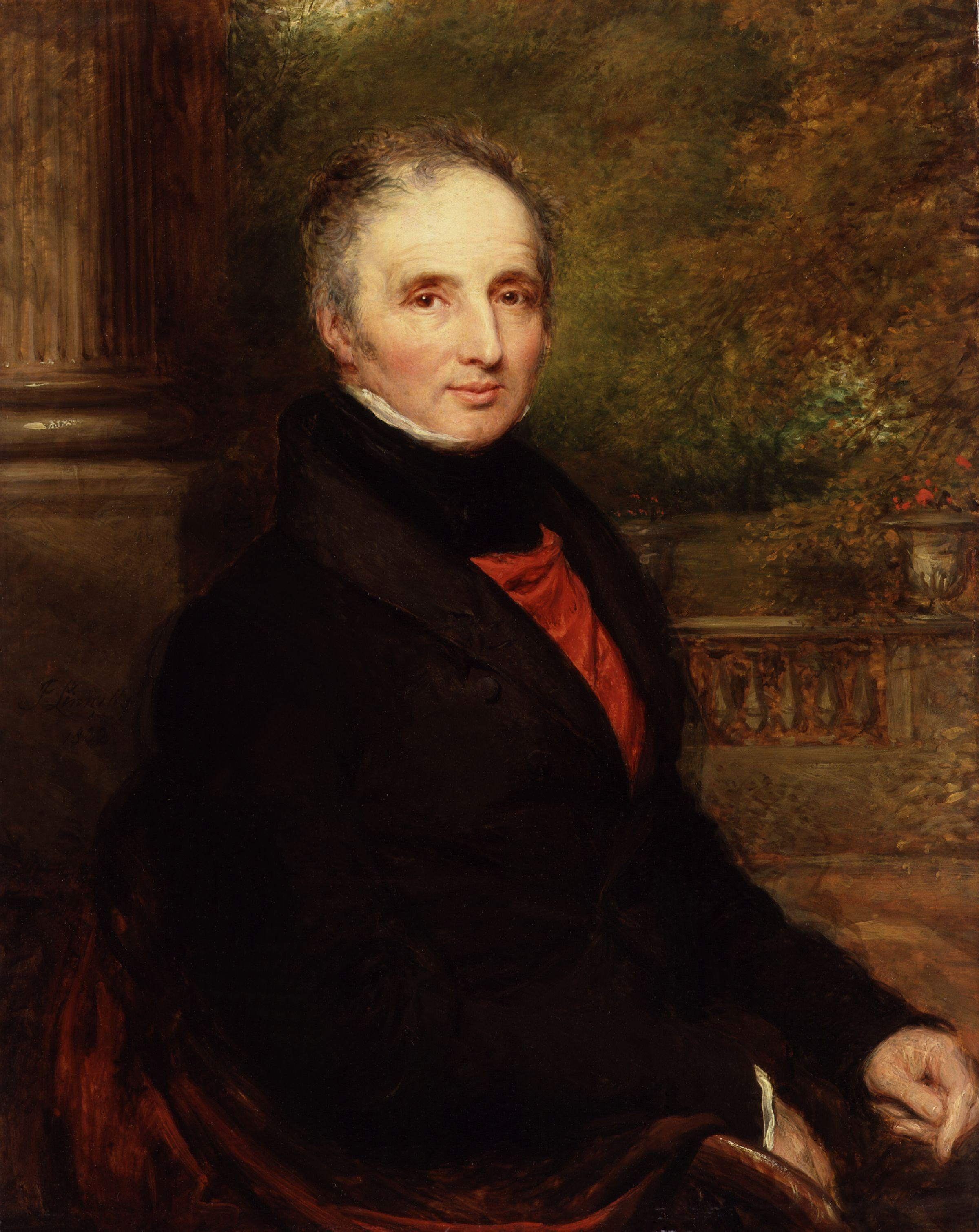
- Portrait by John Linnell, 1832
- Born: 31 August 1775; London, England
- Died: 4 June 1833 (aged 57)
- Education: Eton College
- Alma mater: Trinity College, Cambridge
- Spouse: Lady Hester Fortescue (m. 1804)
- Children: 5, including William and Peter
- Parents: Peter King, 6th Baron King (father); Charlotte Tredcroft (mother)

Peter King, 7th Baron King (31 August 1775 – 4 June 1833) was an English writer.

== Life ==
Born 31 August 1775, baptised 18 September 1775, he was eldest son of Peter King, 6th Baron King, by Charlotte, daughter of Edward Tredcroft of Horsham. He was educated at Eton College and Trinity College, Cambridge, and succeeded to the title in 1793. After a short tour on the continent he returned to England on coming of age, and took his seat in the House of Lords.

Following the Whig traditions of his family, King acted with Lord Holland, whose motion for an inquiry into the causes of the failure of the Anglo-Russian invasion of Holland he supported in his maiden speech, 12 February 1800. His habits, however, were somewhat reclusive. Except to oppose a Habeas Corpus Suspension Bill, or a bill to prolong the suspension of cash payments by the Banks of England and Ireland, begun in 1797, he at first rarely intervened in debate. During a debate in the House of Lords on 5 February 1807 over the proposed Slave Trade Act 1807, which would abolish British involvement in the Atlantic slave trade, he "argued forcibly in support of the motion, which, in his opinion, nothing but the sacrifice of every generous and manly sentiment to cold and low calculations of self-interest; nothing but a perversion of justice and humanity, could induce any man to defend. And with regard to the reliance which some persons professed to place upon the equity and feelings of the colonial legislatures, he begged to know if a perversion of justice and humanity were supported in that house, what was to be expected from less enlightened and liberal assemblies?"

King, in 1811, gave his leasehold tenantry notice that he could no longer accept notes in payment of rent, except at a discount varying according to the date of the lease. Ministers, alarmed that his example might be followed widely, quickly introduced a measure making notes of the Banks of England and Ireland payable on demand legal tender in payment of rent out of court, and prohibiting the acceptance or payment of more than 21 shillings for a guinea. King opposed the bill, and justified his own conduct in a speech later published in pamphlet form; but it passed into law, and was followed in 1812 by a measure making the notes legal tender in all cases.

King's political career was cut short by his sudden death on 4 June 1833.

== Views ==
King was an early opponent of the Corn Laws, which he denounced as a "job of jobs". He supported Catholic emancipation and the commutation of tithes, and opposed grants in aid of the Society for the Propagation of the Gospel in Foreign Parts, pluralities and clerical abuses. He was suspected of a leaning to presbyterianism, with attacks on him made as Hierarchia versus Anarchiam (1831) by Antischismaticus and A Letter to Lord King controverting the sentiments lately delivered in Parliament by his Lordship, Mr. O'Connell, and Mr. Sheil, as to the fourfold division of Tithes (1832) by James Thomas Law.

== Works ==
On the currency question King published a pamphlet Thoughts on the Restriction of Payments in Specie at the Banks of England and Ireland, London, 1803, which went to a second edition. Enlarged, it was reissued as Thoughts on the Effects of the Bank Restrictions, 1804, and was reprinted in A Selection from King's speeches and writings, edited by Earl Fortescue, London, 1844. In this tract King argued that the suspension had caused an excessive issue of notes, particularly by the Bank of Ireland, and a consequent depreciation of the paper and appreciation of bullion; and advocated a gradual return to the system of specie payment. It was reviewed by Francis Horner in the Edinburgh Review, and attracted attention, but without any practical result.

King published also:

- A pamphlet On the Conduct of the British Government towards the Catholics of Ireland, 1807.
- Speech in the House of Lords on the second reading of Earl Stanhope's Bill respecting Guineas and Bank Notes.
- The Life of John Locke, with extracts from his Correspondence, Journals, and Commonplace Books, London, 1829; new edition 1830, 2 vols.; in Bohn's Standard Library, London, 1858.
- A Short History of the Job of Jobs, written in 1825, first published as an anti-cornlaw pamphlet, London, 1846.

== Family ==
King married, on 26 May 1804, Lady Hester Fortescue, daughter of Hugh Fortescue, 1st Earl Fortescue.

They had five children:

- Hon. Hester King, m. Sir George Craufurd
- Hon. Anne King
- Hon. Charlotte King m. Reverend Demetrius Calliphronas, rector of Walpole St. Andrew
- William King, who was created Earl of Lovelace in 1838
- Hon. Peter John Locke King.

== Monument ==
The 7th Baron King has a monument in All Saints' Church, Ockham. In 1735, the King Chapel was added to the church to serve as a chapel over the family vault of the Lords King of Ockham and their descendants, the Earls of Lovelace. it features several church monuments, including the monument to the 7th Baron King by Sir Richard Westmacott in the form of a white marble bust.

== Notes ==
Attribution

This article incorporates text from a publication now in the public domain: Lee, Sidney, ed. (1892). "King, Peter (1776-1833)". Dictionary of National Biography. Vol. 31. London: Smith, Elder & Co.

Peerage of Great Britain
Preceded by Peter King	Baron King; 1793–1833	Succeeded by William King
