= 2011 Guildford Borough Council election =

2011 UK local government election

- 5 May 2011

All 48 seats on the Guildford Borough Council 25 seats needed for a majority
	First party	Second party	Third party
	Con	LD	Lab
Party	Conservative	Liberal Democrats	Labour
Last election	27 seats	21 seats	0 seats
Seats won	34	12	2
Seat change	▲7	▼9	▲2
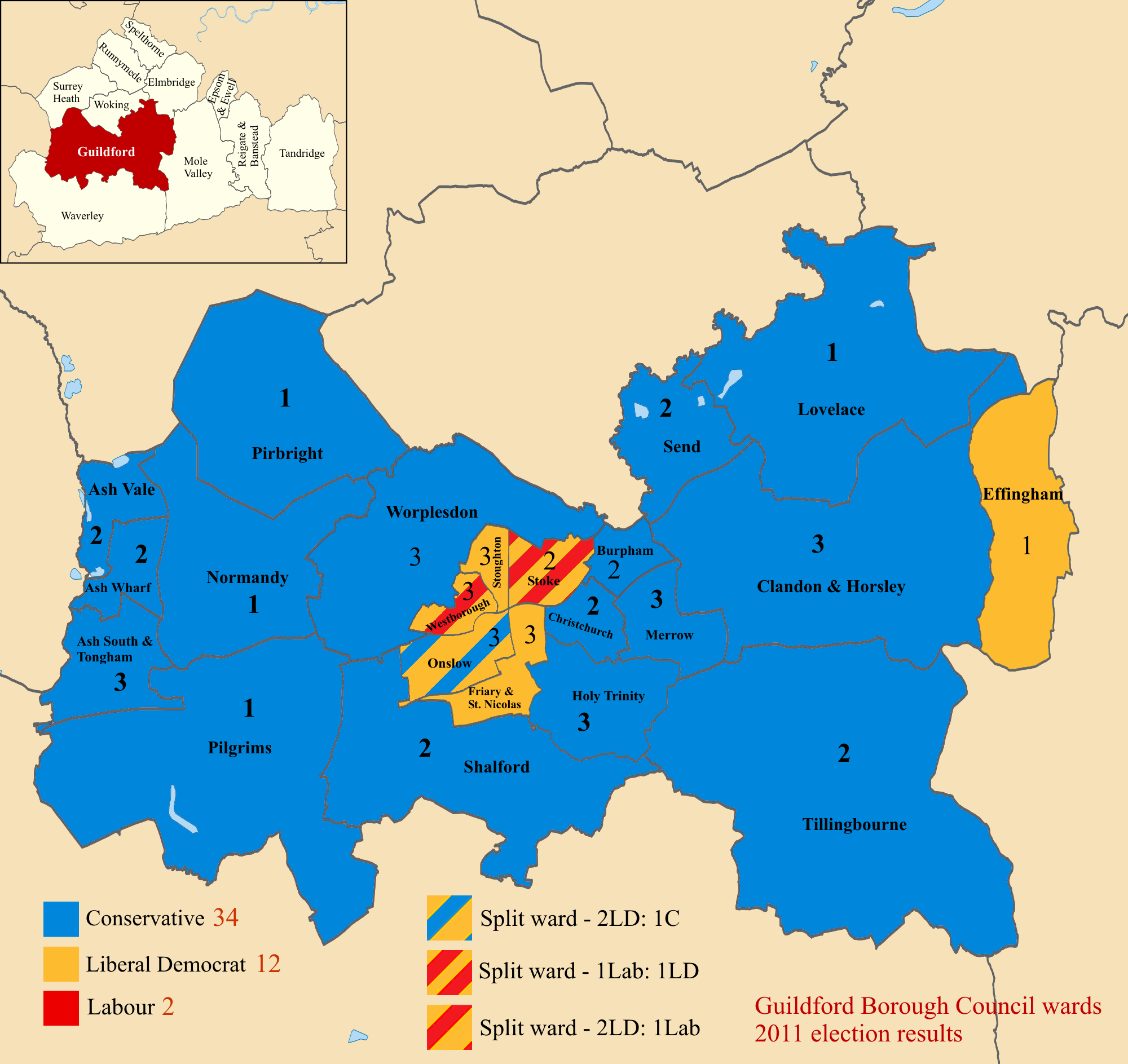
- Map showing the results of the election in each ward
Council control before election
Conservative
Council control after election
Conservative

The 2011 council elections in Guildford saw the Conservatives retain control over Guildford Borough Council with an increased majority of 20 seats. Full results for each ward can be found at Guildford Council election, full results, 2011.

== Summary ==
Going into the 2011 council election the net position was as follows.

Prior to 2011 council election
Party	Seats
Conservative	27
Labour	0
Liberal Democrats	21
Independent	0

After the election the position was as follows.

After 2011 council election
Party	Seats
Conservative	34
Labour	2
Liberal Democrats	12
Independent	0

- the Liberal Democrats lost 9 seats reducing their representation from 21 councillors to 12. Following the 2011 election, the Liberal Democrats held more seats than any other party in the west and north of Guildford town, but were largely wiped out in other areas of Guildford borough. With the exception of Effingham, a rural ward towards the east of the borough, all Liberal Democrat councillors elected in 2011 represented wards in the west and north part of Guildford town itself;
- the Liberal Democrats went into the election exclusively representing 8 wards. After the 2011 elections, the Liberal Democrats exclusively represented only 3 wards: Effingham, Friary & St Nicolas and Stoughton.
- the Conservatives gained 7 seats in the 2011 elections, all at the expense of the Liberal Democrats. This meant that the Conservatives won 34 of the 48 seats on Guildford council and had a majority over all other parties of 20 seats. Large Conservative majorities on Guildford Borough Council had been common during the 1970s and 1980s elections, however prior to the 2011 election they had not occurred since then. The 1991, 1995, 1999, 2003 and 2007 full council elections in Guildford had produced either hung councils or small majorities, the largest of which at the time was 4 seats;
- the Conservative gains were Worplesdon (3 seats); Burpham (2 seats); Onslow (1 of the 3 seats the Liberal Democrats held there) and Holy Trinity (the one remaining seat the Liberal Democrats held there).
- after a four-year absence Labour returned to Guildford Borough Council. Labour won 2 seats, one in Westborough ward and one in Stoke ward, both at the expense of the Liberal Democrats. This partly reversed a trend which had seen the Liberal Democrats take all the seats in the Westborough ward from Labour in the 2003 election and all the seats in Stoke ward from Labour in the 2007 election;
- three wards were split after the election, that is they were represented by councillors of more than one party. These were Onslow (split 1Con: 2LibD); Stoke (split 1 Lab: 1LibD) and Westborough (split 1Lab: 2LibD)

== Individual Wards ==
=== Ash South & Tongham, Ash Vale and Ash Wharf ===
The Ash and Tongham area borders on Aldershot and is to the west of Guildford borough. It is represented by three wards Ash South & Tongham (3 seats), Ash Vale (2 seats) and Ash Wharf (2 seats).

The Conservative held all 7 of these seats going into the election. The Liberal Democrats did not put up a candidate for either Ash South & Tongham or Ash Vale. The Labour Party did not put up a candidate for Ash Vale either. Additionally, despite it being a ward electing three councillors, the Labour Party put up only 2 candidates to contest Ash South & Tongham ward.

Consequently, the only opponent the Conservatives faced in Ash Vale was 1 UKIP candidate against 2 Conservatives for 2 elected positions. The Conservatives averaged over 80% of the available vote per candidate and were elected.

In Ash South & Tongham 3 Conservatives faced 2 Labour opponents for the 3 elected positions. The Conservatives averaged over 80% of the available vote per candidate and were elected.

Of the Ash seats, only in Ash Wharf, the central Ash seat was there a full contest, 2 Conservative, 2 Labour, 2 Liberal Democrat candidates contesting 2 council positions. The Conservative candidates won, averaging around 60% of the available vote.

The Conservatives therefore relatively easily retained all 7 of their Ash and Tongham seats. 6 of the councillors returned were existing local councillors. The exception was, John Randall who was elected for the first time in Ash Wharf.

=== Burpham ===
Burpham was created as a separate ward for the first time in 2003, previously it had been part of the Merrow and Burpham ward which covered much of the east side of the town. Burpham ward, which elects two councillors, was a Conservative – Liberal Democrat marginal in 2003 and 2007 and again in 2011. In 2003, it was split 1 Conservative, 1 Liberal Democrat. In 2007, the Liberal Democrats gained the Conservative seat with a 137-vote majority. In 2011, the Conservatives gained both Liberal Democrat seats with a 125-vote majority. Existing councillors Eddie Owen and Ted Mayne were defeated by Conservatives Christian Holliday and Juneja Monika.

=== Christchurch ===
Christchurch ward is to the east of Guildford town, it elects two councillors. From the 1991 to 2003 elections inclusive the ward had been split 1 Conservative, 1 Liberal Democrat. The Conservatives took both seats in 2007 but it remained a marginal as Matt Furniss won by only 74 votes. A large part of that Liberal Democrat vote during the years 1991 to 2007, especially the latter years, was probably a personal vote for Vivienne Johnson as she significantly and repeatedly out-polled her fellow Liberal Democrat candidates.

Vivienne Johnson did not contest the 2011 election and the election wasn't close. Conservative Matt Furniss obtained around 70% of the available vote and his co-candidate, first time Guildford councillor, Nikki Nelson-Smith received over 60% of the available vote. By contrast the highest Liberal Democrat candidate polled around 25% of the available vote.

=== Clandon & Horsley ===
Clandon & Horsley ward elects three councillors. It covers the four rural villages East and West Clandon plus East and West Horsley which are all to the east of the borough. Despite there being three positions up for election, the Liberal Democrats put up only one candidate to contest the ward. There were two Labour candidates and one UKIP candidate.

Clandon & Horsley is traditionally the safest Conservative ward on Guildford Borough Council.

In 2007 the Conservatives had a majority of 1896. In 2011 that Conservative majority increased to 2083, which was more than twice that of the next biggest majority in any ward in Guildford in 2011; that of Tillingbourne where there was a 1012 majority. Existing councillors Jennifer Powell, Andrew French and Jenny Wicks were re-elected.

=== Effingham ===
Effingham, which elects one councillor, is the most easterly ward in Guildford borough. It is largely centred on the village of Effingham. Liberal Democrat Liz Hogger held on to the seat. Her majority of 166 votes falling slightly from the 211 majority she obtained in 2007.

In 2011, Effingham was the only rural ward held by the Liberal Democrats on Guildford Borough Council. All their other councillors represented town wards. Plus it was the only ward anywhere in Guildford Borough Council where the Liberal Democrats obtained more than 50% of the vote.

=== Friary & St Nicolas ===
Friary & St Nicolas ward covers much of the town centre (the Friary part of the ward) as well as an area to the south west of Guildford town (the St Nicolas bit). The ward elects three councillors. The Liberal Democrats and their predecessors have had at least one councillor representing this ward since it was created in the run up to the 1973 local elections. Since 1983 all councillors elected for this ward in full Guildford Borough Council elections have been Liberal Democrat candidates (or their predecessors the SDP-Liberal Alliance).

In 2007, the Liberal Democrat majority over the Conservatives in Friary & St Nicolas ward reduced, compared to the 2003 local elections, from 1014 to 553. In 2011, the Liberal Democrats retained control of this ward winning all three seats, however their majority over the Conservatives further reduced to 241 votes. Existing councillors David Goodwin, Anne Meredith and Caroline Reeves were re-elected.

Three Peace Party – Non-Violence, Justice, Environment candidates contested Friary & St Nicolas ward. Two of the three Peace Party candidates polled around 4 or 5% of the available vote. One of the Peace Party candidates though polled around 12%, the highest poll figures by far for any Peace Party candidate in the 2011 Guildford elections. Peace Party candidates also contested the Onslow and Westborough wards.

=== Holy Trinity ===
Holy Trinity ward covers a part of the town centre as well as much of the south part of Guildford town. The ward elects three councillors. It had been the only split ward going into the 2011 elections; that is a ward represented by councillors of more than one political party. In 2007 the ward had returned 2 Liberal Democrats and 1 Conservative. As a result of a by election in November 2007, that had changed to 2 Conservative and 1 Liberal Democrat.

In 2011, the Conservatives took all three Holy Trinity seats with a majority of 145 over existing Liberal Democrat councillor Sarah Di Caprio. Existing Conservative councillor Sarah Creedy and by election victor Melanie Bright were elected, as was first time councillor for the area Philip Hooper.

=== Lovelace ===
Lovelace, which elects one councillor, is the name for the rural ward towards the north east of the borough encompassing the villages of Ripley, Ockham and Wisley. Conservative candidate John Garrett got around 70% of the vote. The Labour candidate edged the Liberal Democrat to second place by three votes, both getting just below 15% of the vote.

Just as in the 2003 elections, the Labour candidates by a few votes edged the Liberal Democrat candidates into runner up spot in Lovelace and in the neighbouring ward of Send. Other rural wards in Guildford Borough Council have tended to be Conservative – Liberal Democrat contests, rather than ones where Labour was runner up to the Conservatives. Send and Lovelace are unique in that regard.

=== Merrow ===
Merrow elects 3 councillors. The Conservative majority in Merrow increased from 191 votes to 855. County councillor for the area, Graham Ellwood, topped the poll.

=== Normandy ===
Normandy elects one councillor. It is a rural ward to the west of Guildford, between Guildford town to its east and Ash and Aldershot to its west.

Election results in Normandy can be more volatile in their electoral swings than is typical for rural wards in Guildford. In the 1980s, Normandy was the first ward, outside of Guildford town centre, to elect an SDP-Liberal Alliance councillor in a full Guildford Borough Council election. In 1999, the Conservatives regained Normandy ward from the Liberal Democrats, whereas in the same 1999 election the Liberal Democrats not only comfortably held on to their seats in Guildford town and the eastern part of the borough, but actually made net gains there. In the 2007 election, Conservative Diana Lockyer-Nibbs obtained over 77% of the vote in Normandy, making it one of the safest seats in the borough in that election.

In 2011, Normandy became a marginal as Diana Lockyer-Nibbs only just defeated an independent candidate by 15 votes. The independent candidate campaigned on planning and unauthorised traveller site issues and he later went on to fight and win the ward as the official Conservative candidate in subsequent elections.

Normandy was the only ward in Guildford contested by an independent candidate in 2011.

=== Onslow ===
Onslow ward includes Guildford Park and Onslow Village towards the west south west of Guildford town. Onslow Village despite its name is an early twentieth-century garden suburb rather than a rural village. Onslow ward elects 3 councillors.

In the eight full council elections since 1983, half the time Onslow ward has elected 3 Liberal Democrat councillors (or their predecessors SDP-Liberal Alliance councillors) and half of the time it has elected 1 Conservative councillor plus 2 Liberal Democrats (or SDP-Liberal Alliance) councillors.

1999 was 3 Liberal Democrat councillors; 2003 was 1 Conservative, 2 Liberal Democrats; 2007 was 3 Liberal Democrat councillors; 2011 was 1 Conservative, 2 Liberal Democrats.

In 2011, Conservative Adrian Chandler finished in second place. Existing Liberal Democrat councillor Christopher Ward fell to fourth place in a ward, where only the top three candidates are elected. The other two existing Liberal Democrat councillors Tony Phillips and Steve Freeman were elected in first and third place respectively.

Onslow was the only ward contested by a Green Party candidate. He came fourth last; the three Peace Party candidates all obtained fewer votes than him.

=== Pilgrims ===
Pilgrims is the large rural ward to the south west of Guildford borough. It elects one councillor. An increased turnout, saw Conservative Tony Rooth returned with a higher numerical vote and a higher numerical majority (691 versus 602) but a lower percentage vote and a lower percentage majority. His share of the vote fell from around 83% to around 78%.

=== Pirbright ===
Pirbright, towards the north west of Guildford borough elects one councillor. Labour did not put up a candidate for this ward so it was a straight fight between the Conservatives and the Liberal Democrats as it had been in 2007, and as it had been in the by election in this ward in July 2010. The Conservative share of the vote was roughly 66% in 2007, 64% in the by election and 71% in 2011.

=== Send ===
Send elects two councillors. The Liberal Democrats and Labour each put up one candidate. The Conservatives put up two candidates. Both Conservatives were safely elected. However, there was a marked difference between the polling figures for the two Conservative candidates. Keith Taylor got 302 votes more than his co-candidate. This can only be accounted for by some combination of one of two following things either a large number of electors voted for only one candidate, that candidate being Keith Taylor, or there was a not insignificant number of voters who opted for Conservative-Labour votes and/or Conservative-Liberal Democrat votes with Keith Taylor being the Conservative they selected for those options.

The Labour and Liberal Democrat vote figures were very similar; with the Labour candidate beating the Liberal Democrat candidate by 6 votes.

=== Shalford ===
Shalford ward is to the south of Guildford borough. It elects 2 councillors. The Conservative majority over the Liberal Democrats increased from 495 in 2007, to 746 in 2011.

=== Stoke ===
Stoke ward elects two councillors. Historically the name Stoke applied to much of the north part of Guildford both within and outside the modern town boundaries, but the modern Stoke ward is more limited and is centred on the Bellfields and Slyfield Green parts of Guildford town.

Since the founding of Guildford Borough Council and its first election in 1973, the council has never had a three way Conservative, Labour, Liberal Democrat ward, where going into the count any one of those three parties could realistically have taken the seat. This is because Labour have tended to be only competitive in two wards Stoke and Westborough, where historically their candidates tended to be elected with comfortable majorities, but not elsewhere.

That classic three way Conservative, Labour, Liberal Democrat marginal occurred in Stoke in 2011. Two elected positions were up for grabs contested by 2 Conservative candidates, 2 Labour candidates and 2 Liberal Democrat candidates and no one else. When the votes were counted all six candidates were within 200 votes of one another. When the votes were counted, the average vote per Conservative candidate was above 30%, the average vote per Labour candidate was above 30% and the average vote per Liberal Democrat candidate was above 30%.

The two candidates who had been councillors for the ward previously, were the ones who got elected in 2011. Angela Gunning, Labour councillor from 1995 to 2007 topped the poll. Current Liberal Democrat councillor seeking re-election, Zöe Franklin, was second.

So for which party was it a good result? All parties and none. The Conservatives came closer to being elected in Stoke than in any other Guildford Borough Council full election, since the council was created in the early 1970s. Their top candidate was 35 votes behind second place in a ward where the top two get elected, but they didn't actually get elected. The Labour Party gained a seat, returned to Guildford Borough Council and gained marginally the highest average vote per candidate of any of the parties in Stoke, but at every full election from 1973 to 2003 Labour held Stoke ward by a comfortable vote margin and winning all the seats, whereas in 2011 it was a marginal ward where Labour's actual and percentage votes were noticeably down on its 2003 figures. The Liberal Democrats saw their existing councillor get re-elected in a historically Labour ward in a difficult election for them, but they lost a seat in Stoke and the second Liberal Democrat came last of the six candidates up for election in 2011.

=== Stoughton ===
Along with Friary & St Nicolas, Stoughton has been the Liberal Democrats safest ward since the late 1970s. The Liberal Democrats retained control of Stoughton with all three of their candidates elected. However their majority over the Conservatives reduced from 586 to 208. Existing councillors Pauline Searle, Wendy May and Gillian Harwood were re-elected.

=== Tillingbourne ===
Tillingbourne is the large rural ward to the south east of Guildford borough. It elects 2 councillors. The area includes Shere, Albury and St Martha's. Two Conservative candidates stood as did one Labour candidate and one Liberal Democrat. The Conservatives won comfortably with a majority of 1012.

=== Westborough ===
Westborough is to the west of Guildford town. It includes Park Barn as well as Westborough itself. The ward elects three councillors. From the 1930s until its capture by the Liberal Democrats in 2003 it had been continuously represented by at least one, and usually three, Labour councillors on Guildford Borough Council and its predecessor Guildford Municipal Borough Council. From 2003 the ward had been represented by Liberal Democrat councillors.

One Liberal Democrat candidate, Julia McShane, clearly topped the poll. Thereafter it was a very close result. The next five candidates (the remaining two Liberal Democrats and the three Labour candidates) were all within 55 votes. Third place was 7 votes more than fifth place; third gets elected fourth and fifth do not. The final result saw one Labour gain from the Liberal Democrats, as the ward returned one Labour and two Liberal Democrat councillors.

The UKIP candidate in Westborough finished above the three Peace Party candidates. Westborough was the only ward contested by UKIP in the 2011 Guildford Borough Council elections, where their candidate did not finish in last place.

=== Worplesdon ===
Worplesdon is the predominantly rural ward outside of Guildford town to its north and north west. It includes Worplesdon, Jacobs Well, Fairlands and Wood Street Village as well as a significant area where the town has spilled over into the surrounding countryside near Westborough and Stoughton. Worplesdon elects three councillors.

Since the Liberal Democrats captured the ward in the 1995 local elections, the Conservatives have come close to retaking the Worplesdon seats, but prior to 2011 had not succeeded. In the February 1997 by election in Worplesdon the Conservative candidate was 65 votes behind the elected Liberal Democrat candidate and in the 2003 local elections the top placed Conservative was just 23 votes behind the bottom placed of the three Liberal Democrats who were elected.

2011 saw the Conservatives gain all three Worplesdon seats with a majority of 399 votes, exactly the same majority that the Liberal Democrats had obtained when they gained the seats from the Conservatives back in 1995.
