= 2015 Guildford Borough Council election =

2015 UK local government election

- 7 May 2015

All 48 seats on the Guildford Borough Council 25 seats needed for a majority
	First party	Second party	Third party
	Con	LD	GGG
Party	Conservative	Liberal Democrats	GGG
Last election	34 seats	12 seats	New party
Seats won	35	9	3
Seat change	▲1	▼3	▲3
Popular vote	74,068	35,344	20,614
Percentage	47%	22%	13%
	Fourth party
	Lab
Party	Labour
Last election	2 seats
Seats won	1
Seat change	▼1
Popular vote	17,540
Percentage	11%
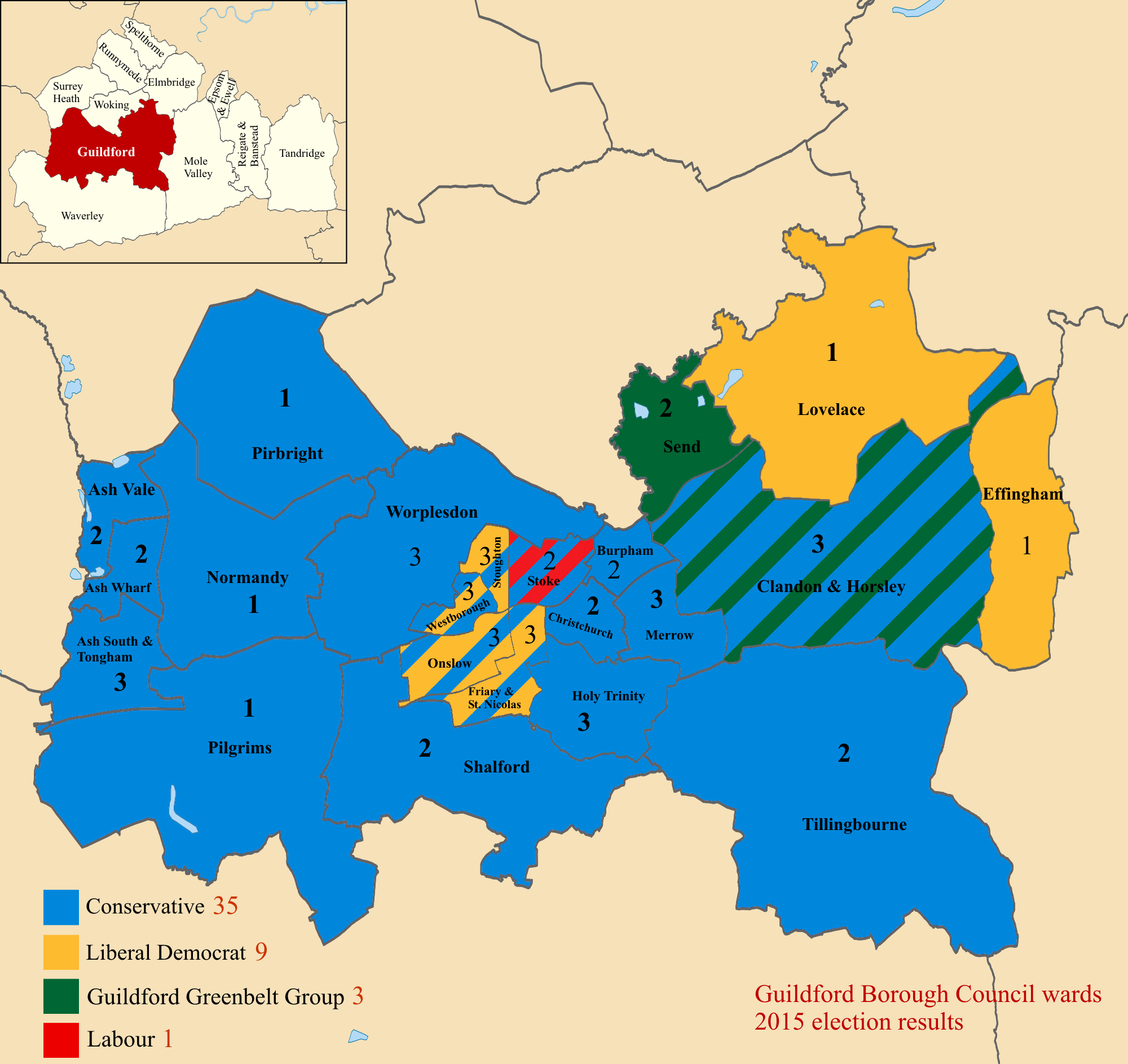
- Map showing the results of the election in each ward
Council control before election
Conservative
Council control after election
Conservative

The 2015 Guildford Borough Council election took place on 7 May 2015 to elect members of Guildford Borough Council in England as one of the 2015 local elections, held simultaneously with the General Election.

== Results ==
The result saw the Conservatives win 35 of the 48 seats on Guildford Borough Council, one more than the 34 seat which they won in the previous elections in 2011.

Towards the north and east of the Borough of Guildford, a new party the Guildford Greenbelt Group won three seats, two in Send ward and one in Clandon & Horsley ward. All three of these gains were from the Conservatives. Also in the north and east of the Borough of Guildford, the Liberal Democrats retained their 2014 by-election gain, which they had made from the Conservatives, in Lovelace ward.

Moving from the east and north east of the borough to the town of Guildford itself, the Conservatives made five gains. They gained one of the three Liberal Democrat seats on Friary & St Nicolas ward, plus one of the three Liberal Democrat seats on Stoughton ward, plus the Liberal Democrat seat on Stoke ward. They also gained two of the three seats on Westborough ward, taking one from the Liberal Democrats and one from Labour.

The summary table below shows changes relative to the 2011 Guildford Borough Council election results. It does not take account of the interim by-election change in Lovelace ward.

Guildford Borough Council Election, 2015
Party	Seats	Gains	Losses	Net gain/loss	Seats %	Votes %	Votes	+/−
Conservative	35	5	4	+1	72	47	74068	
Liberal Democrats	9	1	4	-3	19	22	35344	
GGG	3	3	0	+3	6	13	20614	
Labour	1	0	1	-1	2	11	17540	
Green	0	0	0	0	0	3	4488	
UKIP	0	0	0	0	0	3	4323	
Independent	0	0	0	0	0	1	1425	
Peace	0	0	0	0	0	0.4	555	

== Voting trends ==
This article compares the votes obtained in the 2015 election with those obtained in 2011. The percentages obtained per candidate can be found in the full list of ward by ward results further down this page. The source and methodology for calculating percentages are discussed in the reference notes at the foot of the page.

The 2015 Guildford Borough Council election coincided with the United Kingdom general election. This resulted in a significantly increased turnout.

The wards to the west of Guildford town saw the Conservatives win every single seat, by a comfortable margin. In five of the six rural wards to the west of Guildford where there was both a Liberal Democrat candidate and a Guildford Greenbelt Group candidate, it was the Greenbelt candidate, rather than the Liberal Democrat, who was the runner up to the Conservatives.

The voting behaviour in the town of Guildford itself was different from the rural areas. In a clear majority of the rural wards the top two parties were the Conservatives and the Guildford Greenbelt Group. By contrast in the town of Guildford itself, the Greenbelt Group were not in the top two in any of the wards.

The west side of the town had a number of wards where the total number of votes cast for Conservative candidates in that ward and cast for Liberal Democrats in that ward were nearly equal. The closest was in Stoughton which had a total combined vote for Conservative candidates of 4421, versus 4424 for the Liberal Democrats. In Friary & St Nicolas ward, the total combined vote for the three Conservative candidates was 4265. The total combined vote for the three Liberal Democrat candidates was 4254.

In the east side of the town, other than Stoke ward, the Conservative won comfortably in all the wards, with the Liberal Democrats a distant second.

The Labour percentage vote in the town of Guildford itself, if one considers the wards as a whole, was up. However the Labour vote was down in percentage terms in those wards which had a Labour councillor going into the election.

The most dramatic voting change occurred in the eastern rural wards. Traditionally these have contained the Conservative's safest seats. In 2011, the Conservatives won all six of the council seats in Clandon & Horlsey ward, Lovelace ward and Send ward towards the east and north east of the Borough. In 2015, the Conservative only retained two of those six seats; losing three seats to the Guildford Greenbelt Group and seeing the Liberal Democrats retain their 2014 by election gain in Lovelace ward. The long-term future of the Wisley Airfield site, in Lovelace ward, was one of the issues particular to this part of Guildford Borough.

== Ash ==
=== Ash South & Tongham ===
Ash is to the west of Guildford Borough Council and borders Aldershot further to its west. Ash South and Tongham ward is the southerly one of the three Ash wards. It elects three councillors.

The 2011 elections had seen three Conservative candidates face only 2 Labour candidates and no one else. As a results the three Conservatives had been returned very easily with each candidate getting around 80% of the vote. The 2015 elections were more competitive. Three Conservatives, two Liberal Democrats, one Labour and one Guildford Greenbelt candidate stood for this ward. The three Conservatives won between 63% and 69% of the vote. Two new councillors for the area, Nigel Kearse and Paul Spooner, were amongst those elected. The two Liberal Democrat, one Labour and one Guildford Green Belt candidates each obtained votes in the 20% to 30% region.

=== Ash Vale ===
Ash Vale is the northerly of the three Ash wards. It elects two councillors.

The Liberal Democrats had not put up candidates in either the Ash South & Tongham ward or the Ash Vale ward in the 2011 elections. In 2015 two Liberal Democrats and two Conservatives competed in this ward. The Conservatives won.

There was a noticeable difference between the vote of the top Conservative candidate (71%) and that of the second candidate (60%). By contrast the two Liberal Democrat candidates, in Ash Vale ward, were only 2 vote apart from one another.

=== Ash Wharf ===
Ash Wharf is the central of the three Ash wards. It elects two candidates.

In both the 2011 elections and the 2015 elections, four years later, the top Conservative candidate, in Ash Wharf, obtained 63.3% of the vote.

== West Rural Guildford ==
=== Normandy ===
Normandy elects one councillor. It is the ward between Guildford (the town) and Ash.

The Conservatives held Normandy ward, in 2015, with a majority of 644 over the second placed Guildford Greenbelt candidate. The Liberal Democrats fell back to fourth, behind the Labour candidate. The Liberal Democrats only obtained around 7% of the vote in a seat that they (and their SDP-Liberal Alliance predecessors) had held between 1987 and 1999. New councillor for the area David Bilbe was elected.

=== Pilgrims ===
Pilgrims ward covers a number of small villages along the North Downs. It elects one councillor.

Conservative Tony Rooth was re-elected with 61.9% of the vote, with the Guildford Greenbelt candidate, on 14.6%, in second place.

=== Pirbright ===
Pirbright elects one councillor.

The previous three contests in Pirbright had been straight Conservative versus Liberal Democrat fights. This time, in addition to Conservative and Liberal Democrat candidates, there was also a Guildford Greenbelt candidate.

The Conservative share of the vote has remained within a fairly consistent range, in Pirbright, over the last decade. It was roughly 66% in 2007, 64% in a by election in 2010 and 71% in 2011. In 2015, it was 66%. Existing councillor, Gordon Jackson, was re-elected.

=== Shalford ===
Shalford borders Guildford town to its south west. It elects two councillors. The ward includes Artington and Compton as well as Shalford.

Shalford was one of a number of wards in Guildford where the Conservatives retained the seat in 2015, but with new candidates. Michael Illman and Michael Parsons were elected with a majority that fell slightly from the Conservatives 2011 majority of 746, to 669. The runner up was the Guildford Greenbelt Group.

=== Worplesdon ===
Worplesdon ward borders the town to the north and north west of Guildford. It elects three councillors. It includes a substantial amount of town overspill in addition to villages such as Worplesdon, Fairlands, Jacobs Well and Wood Street village.

The Conservatives retained their three seats in Worplesdon ward. Their majority increased slightly from 399, in 2011, to 426 in 2015. Existing councillors for the area David Elms, Bob McShee and Iseult Roche were re-elected. The Guildford Greenbelt Group were the runners up. The Liberal Democrat vote fell to around 15% (whereas in 2011 it had been in the 32-35% range).

== Guildford Town - West Side ==
=== Friary & St Nicolas ===
Friary & St Nicolas ward elects three councillors. The Friary bit of this ward covers most of the town centre, stretching slightly to its north. The St Nicolas bit of the ward is on the other side (the west side) of the River Wey and covers the south west part of the town.

Prior to the 2015 elections all the councillors, since 1983, for Friary & St Nicolas had been Liberal Democrats (or their predecessors). However the Liberal Democrat majorities had been consistently falling through a number of elections. In 2003 the Liberal Democrat majority had been 1014, in 2007 it was 553, and in 2011 it fell to 241. In 2015, the Conservatives took one of the three Liberal Democrats seats on Friary & St Nicolas ward.

=== Onslow ===
Onslow include Onslow Village, Guildford Park and the University of Surrey. The ward elects three councillors.

In the previous eight full council elections in Onslow, half the time three Liberal Democrats had been elected and the other half of the time two Liberal Democrats and one Conservative had been elected. In 2015, the result in Onslow was, once again, two Liberal Democrats and one Conservative.

The top Labour, Green and Guildford Greenbelt candidates all obtained between 21% and 23% of the vote

The gap between the top Conservative candidate in Onslow and the bottom one was around 14% of the total vote. The gap between the top Greenbelt candidate and the bottom one was between 9 and 10% of the total vote. The gap between the top Labour candidate and the bottom one was between 8 and 9% of the total vote; which tends to indicate that there was a lot of voting splitting between the parties, or plumping for just one candidate.

=== Stoughton ===
Stoughton is to the north west of Guildford. It elects three councillors.

Stoughton was one of three wards to the west of Guildford in which a Conservative topped the poll, followed by two Liberal Democrats. The other two wards were Friary & St Nicolas and Onslow wards.

The Liberal Democrat in third place beat the Conservative in fourth by six votes. Third gets elected, fourth doesn't.

=== Westborough ===
Westborough ward includes Westborough and Park Barn. Park Barn was largely built as a council estate. Westborough ward elects three councillors.

Throughout most of its history, as a council ward, Labour have held all three of the Westborough council seats.

Westborough became a ward on Guildford Municipal Borough Council in 1933, as the boundaries of the town were extended to the west around that time, necessitating a new ward in that area. Between 1933 and 2014, the Conservatives won only once in Westborough ward, in 1968, a year where Labour did very poorly in local elections throughout England and the Conservative gained a lot of their seats as a result.

In 2015 the Conservatives gained two of the three seats on Westborough ward, one at the expense of Labour and one at the expense of the Liberal Democrats. Existing Liberal Democrat councillor Julia McShane was the other person elected.

== Guildford Town - East Side ==
=== Burpham ===
Burpham is towards the north west of the town of Guildford. It elects two councillors.

In the previous three local elections in Burpham (2003, 2007 and 2011), the ward had been a Conservative - Liberal Democrat marginal, where the largest majority had been 137. In 2015, Conservatives Christian Holliday and Mike Piper increased their majority over the top Liberal Democrat candidate, in third place, to 689 votes.

=== Christchurch ===
Christchurch ward covers the area east of Guildford from Cross Lanes in the west to Boxgrove Park and Abbotswood in the east. The ward elects two councillors.

Conservatives Matt Furniss and Nikki Nelson-Smith were re-elected with respectively 67.7% and 56.8% of the vote. The top Liberal Democrat, in third place, won 18.2% of the vote.

=== Holy Trinity ===
Holy Trinity ward include most of the south part of the town on the east side of the River Wey.

Three new Conservatives candidates were elected to represent Holy Trinity ward in 2015. Their majority over the Liberal Democrat in fourth increasing from the 145 majority the Conservatives obtained in 2011, to 438 in 2015.

=== Merrow ===
Merrow elects three councillors.

Other than a period in the 1990s when the Liberal Democrats captured Merrow & Burpham, this has been a safe Conservative ward since the mid 1950s. The Conservative majority over the top placed Liberal Democrat grew from 855 in 2011, to 1348 in 2015.

=== Stoke ===
Stoke ward largely consists of Bellfields and Slyfield Green. Much of Bellfields was originally built as a council estate.

Historically Stoke ward, along with Westborough ward, have been the wards in Guildford most likely to vote Labour. In 2011 Stoke ward had a close result which saw one Labour and one Liberal Democrat elected, with the top Conservative 35 votes off second place. In 2015, longstanding Labour councillor Angela Gunning was re-elected. Also elected was Conservative William Chesterfield; who became the first Conservative to be elected for Stoke ward since 1969.

== East Rural Guildford ==
=== Clandon & Horsley ===
Clandon & Horsley elects three councillors. It is traditionally the Conservatives safest ward on Guildford Borough Council. 2015 saw two Conservatives and one Greenbelt candidate elected in Clandon & Horsley ward. There was a 40% swing from the Conservatives to the Greenbelt candidates in Clandon & Horsley ward.

=== Effingham ===
Effingham is the most easterly of the wards in Guildford Borough. It elects one councillor.

Liberal Democrat Liz Hogger saw her vote increase form 54.7% in 2011 to 60.5% in 2015. In both 2011 and 2015, Liz Hogger got the highest percentage vote of any Liberal Democrat candidate for Guildford Borough Council.

=== Lovelace ===
Lovelace consists of the villages of Ripley, Ockham and Wisley. It elects one councillor.

2014, Liberal Democrat, by election winner Colin Cross retained the seat with a 432 majority over the Guildford Greenbelt candidate in second. The Conservatives were pushed into third. Lovelace was the only ward in Guildford where the Conservatives did not finish in the top two political parties in 2015.

=== Send ===
Send elects two councillors. Two Guildford Greenbelt candidates topped the poll with a 242 majority over the Conservative in third place. As in Clandon & Horsley ward, there was a 40% swing from the Conservatives to the Greenbelt candidates in Send.

There are twenty two wards on Guildford Borough Council. 36.2% of the votes which the Greenbelt Group got throughout Guildford Borough in 2015 came from just one ward - Clandon & Horsley. A further 13.2% of the Greenbelt's Guildford vote, in 2015, came from Send ward.

=== Tillingbourne ===
Tillingbourne includes Shere, Albury and St Martha's. Conservatives Richard Billington and David Wright were re-elected with a 799 majority over the Greenbelt candidate in third place.

== Ward by ward ==
Ash South & Tongham (3 seats)
Party	Candidate	Votes	%	±%
Conservative	Stephen Mansbridge	2,299	69.1	
Conservative	Nigel Kearse	2,199	66.1	
Conservative	Paul Spooner	2,104	63.3	
GGG	Diego Colombo	999	30.0	
Liberal Democrats	Rebecca White	900	27.1	
Labour	Bernard Collins	746	22.4	
Liberal Democrats	Sandra Robinson	665	20.0	
Majority		1105	33.2	
Turnout				
Conservative hold		Swing		
Conservative hold		Swing		
Conservative hold		Swing		

Ash Vale (2 seats)
Party	Candidate	Votes	%	±%
Conservative	Nigel Manning	1,767	70.9	
Conservative	Marsha Moseley	1,491	59.9	
Liberal Democrats	Caroline Johnson	814	32.7	
Liberal Democrats	Rosaleen Morgan	812	32.6	
Majority		677	27.2	
Turnout				
Conservative hold		Swing		
Conservative hold		Swing		

Ash Wharf (2 seats)
Party	Candidate	Votes	%	±%
Conservative	Murray Grubb	1,761	63.3	
Conservative	Jo Randall	1,698	61.0	
Liberal Democrats	Alan Hilliar	986	35.4	
Liberal Democrats	Carolyn Hilliar	953	34.2	
Majority		712	25.6	
Turnout				
Conservative hold		Swing		
Conservative hold		Swing		

Burpham (2 seats)
Party	Candidate	Votes	%	±%
Conservative	Christian Holliday	1,647	55.6	
Conservative	Mike Piper	1,623	54.8	
Liberal Democrats	Ted Mayne	934	31.5	
Liberal Democrats	Nicole Kale	828	28.0	
Labour	Adrian Newton	432	14.6	
Labour	Barry Glassberg	397	13.4	
Majority		689	23.3	
Turnout				
Conservative hold		Swing		
Conservative hold		Swing		

Christchurch (2 seats)
Party	Candidate	Votes	%	±%
Conservative	Matt Furniss	1,989	67.7	
Conservative	Nikki Nelson-Smith	1,669	56.8	
Liberal Democrats	Paul Hienkens	534	18.2	
Liberal Democrats	Nicholas Belfitt	501	17.0	
Green	Sam Peters	369	12.6	
Labour	John Moore	267	9.1	
GGG	Andrea Paton	265	9.0	
Labour	Rajanathan Rajasingham	260	8.8	
Majority		1135	38.6	
Turnout				
Conservative hold		Swing		
Conservative hold		Swing		

Clandon & Horsley (3 seats)
Party	Candidate	Votes	%	±%
Conservative	Jenny Wicks	2,345	46.5	
Conservative	Matthew Sarti	2,308	45.7	
GGG	David Reeve	2,304	45.7	
Conservative	Ian Symes	2287	45.3	
GGG	Chris Tailby	2280	45.2	
GGG	David Parker	2139	42.4	
Liberal Democrats	Ingrid Molossi	451	8.9	
Liberal Democrats	Arnold Pindar	335	6.6	
Labour	Carolyn Fiddles	278	5.5	
Labour	John Brown	258	5.1	
Independent	Jonathan Hill	110	2.2	
Majority		17	0.4	
Turnout				
Conservative hold		Swing		
Conservative hold		Swing		
GGG gain from Conservative				

Effingham (1 seat)
Party	Candidate	Votes	%	±%
Liberal Democrats	Liz Hogger	996	60.5	+5.6
Conservative	Christopher Iles	517	31.4	−10.4
UKIP	Donna Walker	120	7.3	N/A
Majority		479	29.1	
Turnout		1646		
Liberal Democrats hold		Swing		

Friary & St Nicolas (3 seats)
Party	Candidate	Votes	%	±%
Conservative	Alex Chesterfield	1,660	40.3	
Liberal Democrats	Angela Goodwin	1,582	38.4	
Liberal Democrats	Caroline Reeves	1,461	35.5	
Conservative	Alexa Chiltern-Hunt	1380	33.5	
Conservative	Ewan Mactaggart	1225	29.8	
Liberal Democrats	Mike Hutnik	1211	29.4	
Green	Selina Cartledge	902	21.9	
Labour	Elizabeth Bullock	760	18.5	
Green	Mark Parry	601	14.6	
GGG	Anna-Marie Davis	492	12.0	
Labour	Jennifer Mason	486	11.8	
Labour	Chris Pegman	478	11.6	
Majority		81	2.0	
Turnout				
Conservative gain from Liberal Democrats		Swing		
Liberal Democrats hold		Swing		
Liberal Democrats hold		Swing		

Holy Trinity Ward (3 seats)
Party	Candidate	Votes	%	±%
Conservative	Geoff Davis	2,068	51.8	
Conservative	Nils Christiansen	2,025	50.7	
Conservative	Dennis Paul	1,655	41.4	
Liberal Democrats	Jillian Doran	1217	30.4	
Liberal Democrats	Sheena Chawatama	991	24.8	
Liberal Democrats	Marike Denyer	967	24.2	
Labour	Joe Bullock	606	15.2	
Labour	Joan O'Byrne	553	13.8	
Labour	Liam Humble	478	12.0	
GGG	Daisy Fannin	447	11.2	
GGG	Catherine Young	412	10.3	
UKIP	Janet Featherstone	271	6.8	
UKIP	David Sheppard	130	3.3	
UKIP	Peter Turvey	108	2.7	
Majority		438	11.0	
Turnout				
Conservative hold		Swing		
Conservative hold		Swing		
Conservative hold		Swing		

Lovelace (1 seat)
Party	Candidate	Votes	%	±%
Liberal Democrats	Colin Cross	735	53.3	+39.0
GGG	Helen Jeffries	303	22.0	N/A
Conservative	Julie Iles	290	21.0	−50.0
Labour	Keith Chesterton	46	3.3	−11.4
Majority		432	31.3	
Turnout		1379		
Liberal Democrats gain from Conservative		Swing		

Merrow (3 seats)
Party	Candidate	Votes	%	±%
Conservative	Graham Ellwood	2,322	56.9	
Conservative	Philip Brooker	2,149	52.7	
Conservative	Jennifer Jordan	2,143	52.5	
Liberal Democrats	Deanna Davis	795	19.5	
Liberal Democrats	Marilyn Merryweather	756	18.5	
GGG	Mike Bruton	645	15.8	
Liberal Democrats	Alexander Thompkins	600	14.7	
Labour	Malcolm Hill	524	12.8	
Labour	Janet Gosling	509	12.5	
GGG	Gary Walton	471	11.5	
Green	Ana Lynn-Smith	438	10.7	
Green	Morgan Gooch	410	10.1	
Labour	Tim Wolfenden	377	9.2	
Majority		1348	33.0	
Turnout				
Conservative hold		Swing		
Conservative hold		Swing		
Conservative hold		Swing		

Normandy (1 seat)
Party	Candidate	Votes	%	±%
Conservative	David Bilbe	1,068	59.9	+22.3
GGG	Lisa Wright	424	23.8	N/A
Labour	Roger Wintfield	159	8.9	+1.8
Liberal Democrats	Bruce McLaren	123	6.9	−9.8
Majority		644	36.1	
Turnout		1783		
Conservative hold		Swing		

Onslow (3 seats)
Party	Candidate	Votes	%	±%
Conservative	Adrian Chandler	1,293	36.3	
Liberal Democrats	David Goodwin	1,012	28.4	
Liberal Democrats	Tony Phillips	984	27.6	
Conservative	Philip Hooper	915	25.7	
Labour	James Heaphy	819	23.0	
Conservative	Chris Varveris	797	22.4	
Liberal Democrats	George Potter	763	21.4	
GGG	Raymond Briggs	750	21.1	
Green	Peter Sims	747	21.0	
Labour	Dominic Stone	607	17.1	
GGG	Karen Stevens	581	16.3	
Labour	Alistair Tolan	512	14.4	
GGG	Peter Shaw	417	11.7	
Independent	Howard Moss	204	5.7	
Peace	Trevor Jones	172	4.8	
Majority		69	1.9	
Turnout				
Conservative hold		Swing		
Liberal Democrats hold		Swing		
Liberal Democrats hold		Swing		

Pilgrims (1 seat)
Party	Candidate	Votes	%	±%
Conservative	Tony Rooth	910	61.9	−16.8
GGG	Ramsey Nagaty	215	14.6	N/A
UKIP	Geoff Graham	181	12.3	N/A
Liberal Democrats	Susan Howard	160	10.9	−4.1
Majority		695	47.3	
Turnout		1469		
Conservative hold		Swing		

Pirbright (1 seat)
Party	Candidate	Votes	%	±%
Conservative	Gordon Jackson	857	66.0	−6.2
Liberal Democrats	Mags McLaren	248	19.1	−8.7
GGG	Richard Charman	176	13.6	N/A
Majority		609	46.9	
Turnout		1298		
Conservative hold		Swing		

Send (2 seats)
Party	Candidate	Votes	%	±%
GGG	Mike Hurdle	1,524	61.8	
GGG	Susan Parker	1,187	48.1	
Conservative	Julia Osborn	945	38.3	
Conservative	Russ Green	776	31.5	
Liberal Democrats	Anthony Martinelli	177	7.2	
Labour	Rob Woof	156	6.3	
Labour	Sue Wayland	132	5.6	
Majority		242	9.8	
Turnout				
GGG gain from Conservative				
GGG gain from Conservative				

Shalford (2 seats)
Party	Candidate	Votes	%	±%
Conservative	Michael Illman	1,521	53.7	
Conservative	Michael Parsons	1,504	53.1	
GGG	Fiona Curtis	835	29.5	
GGG	Tom Stevens	541	19.1	
Liberal Democrats	Tom Sharp	502	17.7	
Labour	Rose Seber	373	13.2	
Labour	Michael Jeram	348	12.3	
Majority		669	23.6	
Turnout				
Conservative hold		Swing		
Conservative hold		Swing		

Stoke (2 seats)
Party	Candidate	Votes	%	±%
Conservative	William Chesterfield	855	34.0	
Labour	Angela Gunning	780	31.0	
Conservative	Joshua Martin	744	29.6	
Liberal Democrats	Hannah Thompson	678	27.0	
Labour	Michael Hassell	626	24.9	
Liberal Democrats	Stephen Wright	475	18.9	
UKIP	Maureen Craig	459	18.3	
UKIP	Malik Azam	364	14.5	
Majority		36	1.4	
Turnout				
Conservative gain from Liberal Democrats		Swing		
Labour hold		Swing		

Stoughton (3 seats)
Party	Candidate	Votes	%	±%
Conservative	David Quelch	1,812	42.4	
Liberal Democrats	Pauline Searle	1,533	35.9	
Liberal Democrats	Gillian Harwood	1,466	34.3	
Conservative	Andrew Whitby-Collins	1458	34.1	
Liberal Democrats	Lizzie Griffiths	1425	33.4	
Conservative	Malachy Ujam	1151	26.9	
Independent	Tony Ferris	1111	26.0	
Labour	Richard Eggleton	673	15.8	
Labour	George Dokimakis	600	14.0	
Labour	Nick Trier	555	13.0	
UKIP	Terry Wadman	510	11.9	
UKIP	Ngaire Wadman	428	10.0	
Majority		6	0.2	
Turnout				
Conservative gain from Liberal Democrats		Swing		
Liberal Democrats hold		Swing		
Liberal Democrats hold		Swing		

Tillingbourne (2 seats)
Party	Candidate	Votes	%	±%
Conservative	Richard Billington	2,072	67.1	
Conservative	David Wright	1,694	54.9	
GGG	Stephen Parker	895	29.0	
Liberal Democrats	Vicky Barlow	479	15.5	
Liberal Democrats	Anne Meredith	380	12.3	
Labour	Julie Dudley	329	10.7	
Labour	Edward Williams	275	8.9	
Majority		799	25.9	
Turnout				
Conservative hold		Swing		
Conservative hold		Swing		

Westborough (3 seats)
Party	Candidate	Votes	%	±%
Liberal Democrats	Julia McShane	1,238	35.1	
Conservative	Elizabeth Hooper	1,235	35.0	
Conservative	Sheila Kirkland	1,170	33.1	
Conservative	Christine Young	1016	28.8	
Labour	James Walsh	932	26.4	
Liberal Democrats	Fiona White	913	25.9	
Liberal Democrats	Sean Packman	875	24.8	
Labour	Brian Walter	824	23.3	
Labour	Alexander Wilks	821	23.3	
Green	Robert Hardy	577	16.3	
Green	Alan Pavia	444	12.6	
Peace	John Morris	191	5.4	
Peace	Vali Drummond	102	2.9	
Peace	Mohammed Kabir	90	2.5	
Majority		154	4.3	
Turnout				
Liberal Democrats hold		Swing		
Conservative gain from Liberal Democrats		Swing		
Conservative gain from Labour		Swing		

Worplesdon (3 seats)
Party	Candidate	Votes	%	±%
Conservative	David Elms	2,069	50.7	
Conservative	Bob McShee	1,957	48.0	
Conservative	Iseult Roche	1,628	39.9	
GGG	Neville Bryan	1202	29.5	
GGG	John Rowland	1110	27.2	
UKIP	Harry Aldridge	777	19.0	
Liberal Democrats	Victor Seale	667	16.3	
Liberal Democrats	Donna Avory	637	15.6	
Liberal Democrats	Kate Creagh	585	14.3	
Labour	Brenda Hill	564	13.8	
UKIP	Mike Pitman	509	12.5	
UKIP	George Johnson	466	11.4	
Majority		426	10.4	
Turnout				
Conservative hold		Swing		
Conservative hold		Swing		
Conservative hold		Swing		

== By-Elections ==
A by-election was held on 5 May 2016 in Stoke ward following the resignation of William Chesterfield.

Stoke
Party	Candidate	Votes	%	±%
Labour	James Walsh	528	34.8	+9.9
Conservative	Barry Keane	497	32.8	−1.2
Liberal Democrats	Hannah Thompson	492	32.4	+5.4
Majority		31	2.0	
Turnout		1,517		
Labour gain from Conservative		Swing		

== See also ==
- Guildford Council election, full results, 2011
