= Lovelace Bridges =

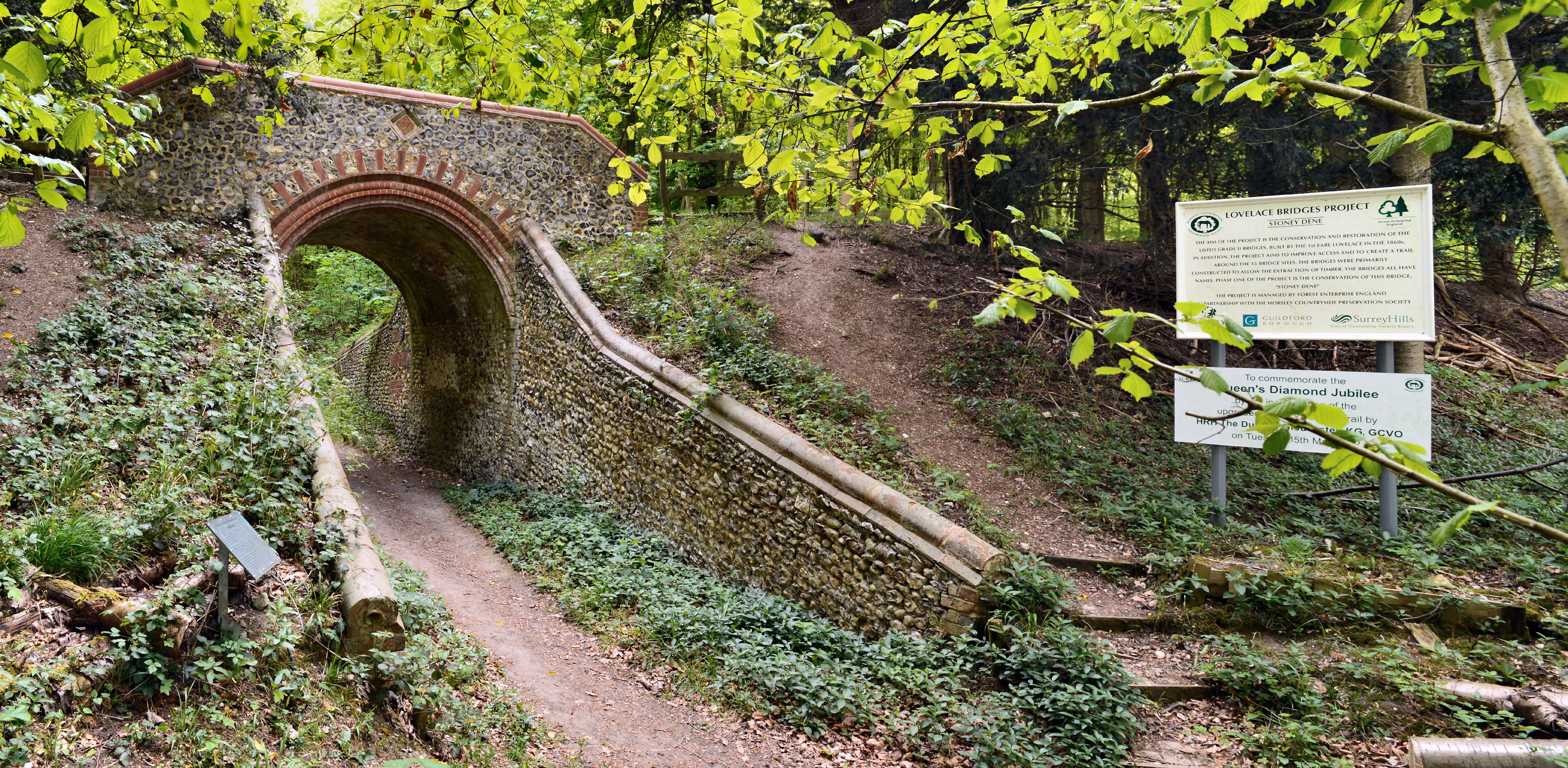
Stoney Dene Bridge

The Lovelace Bridges were built by William King, 1st Earl of Lovelace (1805-1893) on his estate at East Horsley, Surrey, in the 1860s. Fifteen bridges were built to facilitate the transport of timber by horse-drawn carts. The bridges were built where the tracks crossed existing bridleways or roads. Ten bridges still exist.

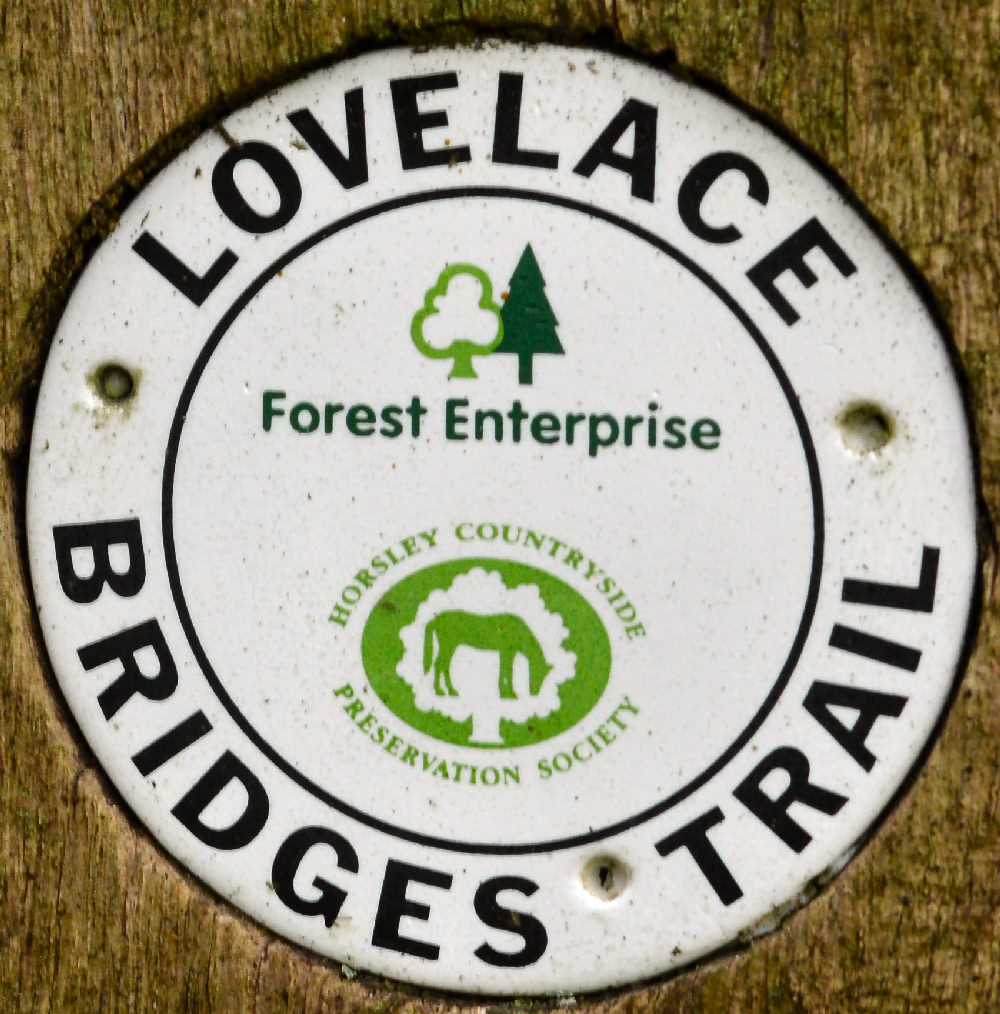
Lovelace Bridges Trail sign

The bridges were constructed from local flint and brick; they all had plaques with their name and dates. Most of the bridges are horseshoe shaped "Moorish" design, between a span of six feet at Meadow Plat to eighteen feet for the Dorking Arch, which crosses Crocknorth road. The Earl had his own brickworks in West Horsley/Ockham and the lime for the mortar would have been local, possibly from chalk pits in Kiln Field Coppice. The saw mill was near Brockhole Cross, near the junction with Outdowns on the Epsom Road.

There is a Lovelace Bridges Trail produced by the Horsley Countryside Preservation Society and there is a project to conserve the bridges managed by Forestry England.

== Remaining bridges ==
Bridge	Listed Building		Location	Grid Reference
Bridge	Grade	Reference number	Location	Grid Reference
Briary Hill East Bridge	II	1294884	Honeysuckle Bottom, East Horsley	TQ 09956 50813
Briary Hill West Bridge	II	1029417	Honeysuckle Bottom, East Horsley	TQ 09854 50818
Dorking Arch Bridge	II	1187984	Crocknorth Road, East Horsley	TQ 09983 51163
Hermitage Bridge	II	1377858	Sheepwalk Lane, East Horsley	TQ 10200 50209
Meadow Plat Bridge			Effingham	TQ 107508
Oldlands Bridge	II	1029395	Outdowns, Effingham (no public access)	TQ 10686 52185
Raven Arch Bridge	II	1029416	Honeysuckle Bottom, East Horsley	TQ 09625 51058
Robin Hood Bridge	II	1294880	Green Dene, East Horsley	TQ 09694 51332
Stoney Dene Bridge	II	1246731	Effingham	TQ 10567 51746
Troy Bridge	II	1029426	Sheepwalk Lane, East Horsley	TQ 09576 50226

== Lost bridges ==
The following bridges no longer exist: Outdowns Bridge, Pine Grove Bridge, Horse Close Bridge, Oakhanger Bridge and Falcon Arch.
