= 2011 Guildford Council election, full results =

A summary of these results can be found at 2011 Guildford Council election

== Ward results ==
Ash South & Tongham (top 3 candidates elected)
Party	Candidate	Votes	%	±%
Conservative	Stephen David Winstanley Mansbridge	1684	81.1	
Conservative	Douglas Melville Richards	1683	81.0	
Conservative	Nicholas John Sutcliffe	1636	78.8	
Labour	Conor Campbell	643	31.1	
Labour	Barry Hall	474	22.8	
Majority		993	47.7	
Turnout				
Conservative hold		Swing		
Conservative hold		Swing		
Conservative hold		Swing		

Ash Vale (top 2 candidates elected)
Party	Candidate	Votes	%	±%
Conservative	Nigel Manning	1339	86.5	
Conservative	Marsha Jayne Moseley	1209	78.1	
UKIP	Mazhar Manzoor	368	23.8	
Majority		841	54.3	
Turnout				
Conservative hold		Swing		
Conservative hold		Swing		

Ash Wharf (top 2 candidates elected)
Party	Candidate	Votes	%	±%
Conservative	Jayne Hewlett	1185	63.3	
Conservative	John Leslie Randall	1063	56.8	
Labour	Michael Patrick Gallagher	418	22.3	
Liberal Democrats	Alan Richard Hilliar	416	22.2	
Liberal Democrats	Angela Marie Goodwin	324	17.3	
Labour	Joan Anne May O'Byrne	300	16.0	
Majority		645	34.5	
Turnout				
Conservative hold		Swing		
Conservative hold		Swing		

Burpham (top 2 candidates elected)
Party	Candidate	Votes	%	±%
Conservative	Christian John Holliday	1068	48.6	
Conservative	Monika Juneja	1046	47.6	
Liberal Democrats	Edward Owen	921	41.9	
Liberal Democrats	Edward Patrick Mayne	887	40.4	
Labour	Adrian Charles Newton	232	10.6	
Labour	Barry Thomas Glassberg	220	10.0	
Majority		125	5.7	
Turnout				
Conservative gain from Liberal Democrats		Swing		
Conservative gain from Liberal Democrats		Swing		

Christchurch (top 2 candidates elected)
Party	Candidate	Votes	%	±%
Conservative	Matthew Paul Furniss	1571	70.0	
Conservative	Nicola Katrin Vale	1397	62.3	
Liberal Democrats	Elizabeth Ann Griffiths	565	25.1	
Liberal Democrats	George Weightman Potter	458	20.4	
Labour	John Moore	247	11.0	
Labour	Rajanathan Rajasingham	212	9.5	
Majority		832	37.2	
Turnout				
Conservative hold		Swing		
Conservative hold		Swing		

Clandon & Horsley (top 3 candidates elected)
Party	Candidate	Votes	%	±%
Conservative	Jennifer Eleri Powell	2980	85.4	
Conservative	Andrew John French	2853	81.8	
Conservative	Jennifer Mary Wicks	2728	78.2	
Liberal Democrats	Arnold George Pindar	645	18.5	
Labour	John Virgo Brown	436	12.5	
Labour	Carolyn Fiddes	431	12.4	
UKIP	Garreth Peter Evans	333	9.5	
Majority		2083	59.7	
Turnout				
Conservative hold		Swing		
Conservative hold		Swing		
Conservative hold		Swing		

Effingham (only 1 candidate elected)
Party	Candidate	Votes	%	±%
Liberal Democrats	Elizabeth Irene Hogger	693	54.7	
Conservative	Ian Charles Frederick Symes	527	41.6	
Labour	Fanny Lines	42	3.3	
Majority		166	13.1	
Turnout				
Liberal Democrats hold		Swing		

Friary & St. Nicolas (top 3 candidates elected)
Party	Candidate	Votes	%	±%
Liberal Democrats	David John Goodwin	1238	45.2	
Liberal Democrats	Anne Mary Meredith	1214	44.3	
Liberal Democrats	Caroline Anne Reeves	1202	43.9	
Conservative	Elizabeth Ann Hooper	961	35.1	
Conservative	Michael John Gorman	891	32.5	
Conservative	Waqas Kamran Ahmad	744	27.1	
Labour	Elizabeth Mary Bullock	456	16.6	
Labour	Daniel King	403	14.7	
Labour	Caroline Mary Lloyd	401	14.6	
Peace	Annette Sarah Goggin	328	12.0	
Peace	Thomas Harry May	142	5.2	
Peace	Christopher Alexander Morrison	124	4.5	
Majority		241	8.8	
Turnout				
Liberal Democrats hold		Swing		
Liberal Democrats hold		Swing		
Liberal Democrats hold		Swing		

Holy Trinity (top 3 candidates elected)
Party	Candidate	Votes	%	±%
Conservative	Sarah Kathleen Creedy	1640	56.0	
Conservative	Melanie Bright	1597	54.5	
Conservative	Philip Matthew Simon Hooper	1363	46.5	
Liberal Democrats	Sarah Jane Elizabeth Di Caprio	1218	41.6	
Liberal Democrats	Michael Wynne Andrew	1026	35.0	
Liberal Democrats	Andrew Howard Barnes	886	30.2	
Labour	Jennifer Briony Mason	330	11.3	
Labour	Joseph Ian Bullock	327	11.2	
Labour	Christopher Pegman	292	10.0	
Majority		145	4.9	
Turnout				
Conservative hold		Swing		
Conservative hold		Swing		
Conservative gain from Liberal Democrats		Swing		

Lovelace (only 1 candidate elected)
Party	Candidate	Votes	%	±%
Conservative	John Richard Garrett	648	70.3	
Labour	Robin Clifford Woof	134	14.5	
Liberal Democrats	Philip John Palmer	131	14.2	
Majority		514	55.8	
Turnout				
Conservative hold		Swing		

Merrow (top 3 candidates elected)
Party	Candidate	Votes	%	±%
Conservative	Graham Thomas Ellwood	1884	58.9	
Conservative	David George Carpenter	1881	58.8	
Conservative	Jennifer Jordan	1853	57.9	
Liberal Democrats	Anna Stefanie Elda Riches	998	31.2	
Liberal Democrats	Philip Ross Tree	918	28.7	
Liberal Democrats	Daniel Anthony Sear	890	27.8	
Labour	Janet Gosling	390	12.2	
Labour	Malcolm Piers Hill	388	12.1	
Labour	Tim David Wolfenden	308	9.6	
Majority		855	26.7	
Turnout				
Conservative hold		Swing		
Conservative hold		Swing		
Conservative hold		Swing		

Normandy (only 1 candidate elected)
Party	Candidate	Votes	%	±%
Conservative	Diana Lockyer-Nibbs	531	38.4	
Independent	David John Bilbe	516	37.3	
Liberal Democrats	Mary Laker	229	16.6	
Labour	Phelim John Joseph Brady	98	7.1	
Majority		15	1.1	
Turnout				
Conservative hold		Swing		

Onslow (top 3 candidates elected)
Party	Candidate	Votes	%	±%
Liberal Democrats	Tony Phillips	995	44.0	
Conservative	Adrian Stuart Chandler	979	43.3	
Liberal Democrats	Steven Christopher Freeman	880	38.9	
Liberal Democrats	Christopher John Ward	875	38.7	
Conservative	Michael Philip John Illman	736	32.5	
Conservative	Michael John Piper	721	31.9	
Labour	Heaphy, James Heaphy, James	405	17.9	
Labour	Jamie Fletcher	372	16.4	
Labour	Raymond Thomas Rogers	344	15.2	
Green	Nathaniel Frank Harding	217	9.6	
Peace	Haraldur Tristan Gunnarsson	69	3.0	
Peace	Ioanna Ioannou	62	2.7	
Peace	Patricia Mary Anne Hamilton	54	2.4	
Majority		5	0.2	
Turnout				
Liberal Democrats hold		Swing		
Conservative gain from Liberal Democrats		Swing		
Liberal Democrats hold		Swing		

Pilgrims (only 1 candidate elected)
Party	Candidate	Votes	%	±%
Conservative	Anthony Rooth	854	78.3	
Liberal Democrats	Marilyn Merryweather	163	14.9	
Labour	Mary Alice Davies	68	6.2	
Majority		691	63.4	
Turnout				
Conservative hold		Swing		

Pirbright (only 1 candidate elected)
Party	Candidate	Votes	%	±%
Conservative	Gordon Ackroyd Jackson	592	71.3	
Liberal Democrats	Margaret Mclaren	228	27.5	
Majority		364	43.8	
Turnout				
Conservative hold		Swing		

Send (top 2 candidates elected)
Party	Candidate	Votes	%	±%
Conservative	Keith Charles Taylor	1349	87.4	
Conservative	Terence Dickson Patrick	1047	67.8	
Labour	Sheila Bean	337	21.8	
Liberal Democrats	Timothy Laurence Palmer	331	21.4	
Majority		710	46.0	
Turnout				
Conservative hold		Swing		
Conservative hold		Swing		

Shalford (top 2 candidates elected)
Party	Candidate	Votes	%	±%
Conservative	James John Palmer	1316	61.0	
Conservative	Neil Ward	1271	58.9	
Liberal Democrats	Kimberley Maclean	525	24.3	
Liberal Democrats	David Vyvyan Orchard	442	20.5	
Labour	Michael Stanley Jeram	334	15.5	
Labour	John Wood Milne	224	10.4	
UKIP	Oliver Neville	176	8.2	
Majority		746	34.6	
Turnout				
Conservative hold		Swing		
Conservative hold		Swing		

Stoke (top 2 candidates elected)
Party	Candidate	Votes	%	±%
Labour	Angela Jane Gunning	659	38.6	
Liberal Democrats	Zöe Franklin	610	35.8	
Labour	Michael Joseph Hassell	589	34.5	
Conservative	Barry John Keane	575	33.7	
Conservative	George Edward Burr	526	30.8	
Liberal Democrats	Ollie William Edward Clokie	462	27.1	
Majority		21	1.3	
Turnout				
Labour gain from Liberal Democrats		Swing		
Liberal Democrats hold		Swing		

Stoughton (top 3 candidates elected)
Party	Candidate	Votes	%	±%
Liberal Democrats	Pauline Ann Searle	1331	48.5	
Liberal Democrats	Wendy Anne May	1324	48.2	
Liberal Democrats	Gillian Michelle Harwood	1259	45.8	
Conservative	David James Quelch	1051	38.3	
Conservative	Sharon Denise Stokes	1039	37.8	
Conservative	Keith Francis Witham	837	30.5	
Labour	Peter Smeed	404	14.7	
Labour	Rosemary Ellice Seber	379	13.8	
Labour	Nicholas Maxwell Trier	370	13.5	
UKIP	Walter Terence Wadman	194	7.1	
Majority		208	7.5	
Turnout				
Liberal Democrats hold		Swing		
Liberal Democrats hold		Swing		
Liberal Democrats hold		Swing		

Tillingbourne (top 2 candidates elected)
Party	Candidate	Votes	%	±%
Conservative	Richard John Billington	1670	82.2	
Conservative	David Alan Wright	1499	73.8	
Liberal Democrats	Rebecca Jean White	487	24.0	
Labour	Brian Keith Chesterton	357	17.6	
Majority		1012	49.8	
Turnout				
Conservative hold		Swing		
Conservative hold		Swing		

Westborough (top 3 candidates elected)
Party	Candidate	Votes	%	±%
Liberal Democrats	McShane, Julia Maureen	819	37.2	
Liberal Democrats	Mark Richard Chapman	741	33.6	
Labour	Christian Gilliam	709	32.2	
Labour	James Clarke	703	31.9	
Liberal Democrats	Fiona Jean White	702	31.9	
Labour	Brian Stanley Walter	686	31.1	
Conservative	Andrew Thomas Ellwood	630	28.6	
Conservative	Regina Christine Young	555	25.2	
Conservative	Katrina Sale	502	22.8	
UKIP	Colin James Reardon	179	8.1	
Peace	John Hugh Morris	133	6.0	
Peace	Andrew Verner James Messinger	112	5.1	
Peace	Marcus Colin Trower	85	3.9	
Majority		6	0.3	
Turnout				
Liberal Democrats hold		Swing		
Liberal Democrats hold		Swing		
Labour gain from Liberal Democrats		Swing		

Worplesdon (top 3 candidates elected)
Party	Candidate	Votes	%	±%
Conservative	Robert Anthony McShee	1660	55.0	
Conservative	David Peter Elms	1595	52.9	
Conservative	Iseult Julia Roche-Costeloe	1465	48.6	
Liberal Democrats	Jill Margaret Chan	1066	35.3	
Liberal Democrats	Paul Cragg	1065	35.3	
Liberal Democrats	Victor John Searle	980	32.5	
Labour	Brenda Rosemary Hill	374	12.4	
Labour	Martin Phillips	365	12.1	
Labour	Jack White	342	11.3	
Majority		399	13.3	
Turnout				
Conservative gain from Liberal Democrats		Swing		
Conservative gain from Liberal Democrats		Swing		
Conservative gain from Liberal Democrats		Swing		
