= Ockham =

Occam or Ockham may refer to:

== People ==
- William of Ockham (c. 1287–1347), English friar, philosopher and theologian
  - Ockham's Razor, named after him
- Byron King-Noel, Viscount Ockham (1836–1862), British peer
- Peter King, 1st Baron King of Ockham (1669–1734), English lawyer, politician, Lord Chancellor of England

== Places ==
- Ockham, Surrey, England, a village believed to be the birthplace of William of Ockham
- Ockham Park, seventeenth century English country house in Ockham, Surrey

== Other ==
- HMS Ockham (M2714), one of 93 ships of the Ham-class of inshore minesweepers
- occam (programming language), also named after William of Ockham

== OCCAM as acronym ==
- Observatory for Cultural and Audiovisual Communication in the Mediterranean, established in 1996 by UNESCO in Milan
- Office of Cancer Complementary and Alternative Medicine, an office of the National Cancer Institute
- Oxford Centre for Collaborative Applied Mathematics, a research centre at the University of Oxford

== See also ==
- Oakham (disambiguation)
- Occam learning, model of algorithmic learning
- Occam process, a method for the manufacture of populated, printed circuit boards
- Ockham algebra, bounded distributive lattice with a dual endomorphism
- Ockham Awards, annual awards by The Skeptic magazine
- Ockham New Zealand Book Awards, a series of awards to works of New Zealand citizens
- Ockham's Razor Theatre Company, an aerial theatre company
