= Wisley Airfield =

Former airfield in Surrey, England

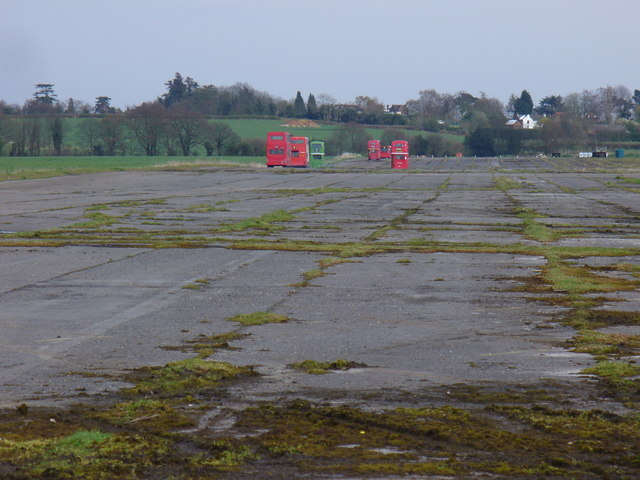
- View along the former runway
- IATA: none; ICAO: none

Summary
- Location: Ockham, Surrey, England
- Closed: April 1972
- Built: 1944
- In use: Vickers-Armstrongs and BAC flight testing
- Elevation AMSL: 151 ft (46 m)
- Coordinates: 51°18′23″N 000°27′32″W

Map
- Location within Surrey

Runways
Direction	Length		Surface
Direction	ft	m	Surface
10/28	6,200	1,900

Wisley Airfield is a former wartime airfield located in the Parish of Ockham near Wisley in Surrey, England. Originally a grass airstrip used to test aircraft built at Weybridge by Vickers, the runway was converted to tarmac in 1952. The airfield continued in use for test aircraft when Vickers aviation activities were subsumed into British Aircraft Corporation (BAC). Flying ceased in 1973 because the runway was too short for large aircraft and was too close to Heathrow Airport. All the structures on the site were removed, except for the runway, and the land was sold back to its principal former owner in 1980 for agricultural use.

== History ==
The land on which this airstrip was built was requisitioned in 1942 during WWII by the Ministry of Supply and leased to Vickers-Armstrong. Land was contributed mainly by the Ockham Park Estate, which at the time owned most of the Village of Ockham, Surrey. Land was taken mainly from Hyde, Stratford and Corsair farms – with land contributed by other tenants. The farm tenants vacated their houses to comply with the government's requirements. It has been generally believed and accepted that the government gave an undertaking to restore the land to its pre-war condition when it was returned to its original owners.

In May 1969, Wisley was chosen due to its proximity to London, as the arrival runway for the Daily Mail trans Atlantic race for the Royal Navy Phantom FG.1, piloted by Lt Cmdr Burrowman. Upon touch down, both main tyres burst causing the Phantom to struggle until successfully coming to a halt. From Bisley, Burrowman completed the final leg to London by Wessex helicopter.

In 1972 BAC terminated their lease. By that point the Ministry of Defence had inherited the land from the Ministry of Supply and decided on disposal of the land which was carried out by the Property Services Agency (PSA).

As the land was not registered at the Land Registry until 1981, the wartime transfers of the land and any accompanying conditions are not recorded. The matter was raised in the House of Lords in Parliament at the time the land was sold back to Lord Lytton (the inheritor of the Ockham Park Estate) in 1980.

Objecting to possible use of the airfield for executive jets, Lord Nugent said:

The history of the airfield is that it was originally requisitioned in wartime in 1943 for wartime purposes and from that time there has been a clear undertaking that when it was no longer required for these purposes it would be returned for its pre-war agricultural use. Over the intervening years this undertaking has been re-stated from time to time by various Government departments who have been responsible for authorising this special occupancy. The local authorities, the Surrey County Council and the Guildford Borough Council, insisted that when the property was sold back to its pre-war owner, Lord Lytton, all the buildings and hard standings, including the runway, must be removed to ensure a return to its agricultural use before the war and to preserve the general policy of conserving the green belt. More recently, after a good deal of discussion, these conditions were con-confirmed and a letter was sent by the PSA (Note: The Property Services Agency (PSA) was an agency of the United Kingdom government, in existence from 1972 to 1993. Its role was to "provide, manage, maintain, and furnish the property used by the government, including defence establishments, offices, courts, research laboratories, training centres and land".) on 15th November 1977 to the effect that Wisley Airfield would not be sold until both the buildings and the runway had been removed. Further letters were written in 1978 confirming this and, finally, there was a letter from the junior Minister of the Department of the Environment Mr. Ken Marks, on 6th March last year (1979) to the Dorking Member of Parliament, Sir George Sinclair, making the same confirmation. It was thus a great surprise to everybody when the axe fell on 13th July last year with a letter from the PSA stating that the sale would be made with the runway still in situ. This decision by the PSA makes the site available for future use as a commercial airport, in direct breach of all the undertakings over the previous 36 years and in direct breach of the major conservation considerations for the green belt. My noble friend Lord Onslow will deal in more detail with the particular villainies of the breach.

— Hansard, 2 December 1980

The Minutes of Ockham Parish Council confirm that this was the general understanding at the time.

== Location filming ==
The site is attractive as a film location. As high ground it has superb uninterrupted views south towards the North Downs. These views form a backdrop for film makers and have the advantage of being available close to London. These vistas of countryside helped re-create the landscape of northern France for filming of the Steven Spielberg film War Horse which took place in October 2010.

Award-winning British film director John Boorman reconstructed a wartime suburban London street on part of the disused runway as the main film set for his autobiographical 1987 film Hope and Glory.

== Future plans ==
In March 2010, the then-Secretary of State for Communities and Local Government, John Denham, gave permission to Wharf Land Investments to build a large composting facility on the former airfield but so far this has not been constructed. The new plant would be capable of processing 30,000 tonnes of waste per year and take up 17 hectares (42 acres). A new road linking from the A3 Ockham roundabout would also be created to enable access. The Government approved the proposal after Surrey County Council did not record a decision within the required time. Local residents and nearby visitor attractions including RHS Garden, Wisley had raised concerns over the daily level of traffic that would visit the plant.

In 2014 plans were unveiled for a proposed new town on the green belt land of Wisley Airfield in which between 2,000 and 2,250 new homes would be built. The plans were rejected by Guildford Borough Council and a subsequent Appeal to the Planning Inspectorate also dismissed in June 2018.

In March 2020, Taylor Wimpey purchased the site for development and as of August 2020, community consultation events were ongoing. A Q&A document was formalised in July 2020 where the public asked questions of the developers and responses were formally recorded.

The Stratford View development, 459 new homes to be built by Taylor Wimpey, was authorised in November 2025.
