= All Saints' Church, Ockham =

All Saints, Ockham
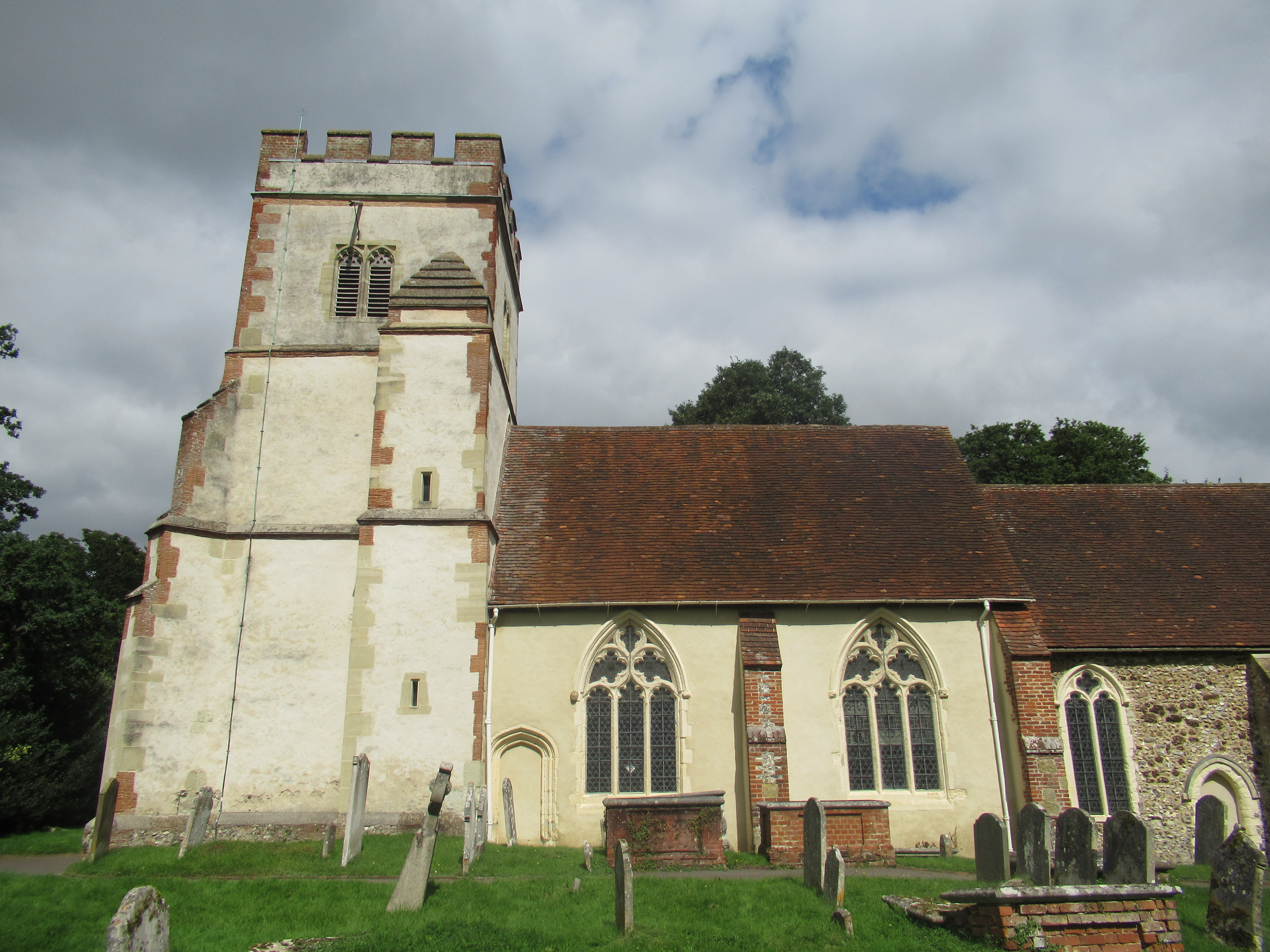
- Church of All Saints and churchyard
- 51°17.88′N 0°28.30′W
- Location: Ockham Road North, Woking, Surrey GU23 6NL
- Denomination: Church of England
- Website: Ockham Church

History
- Dedication: All Saints

Administration
- Province: Guildford
- Diocese: Guildford
- Archdeaconry: Dorking
- Parish: Ockham with Hatchford and Downside

Clergy
- Vicar(s): Rev. Hugh Grear

The Church of All Saints, usually known as All Saints' Church, is an Anglican church in Ockham, England. It is the parish church of Ockham with Hatchford and Downside. Due to its architectural significance, the church is a Grade I listed building.

== Architecture ==
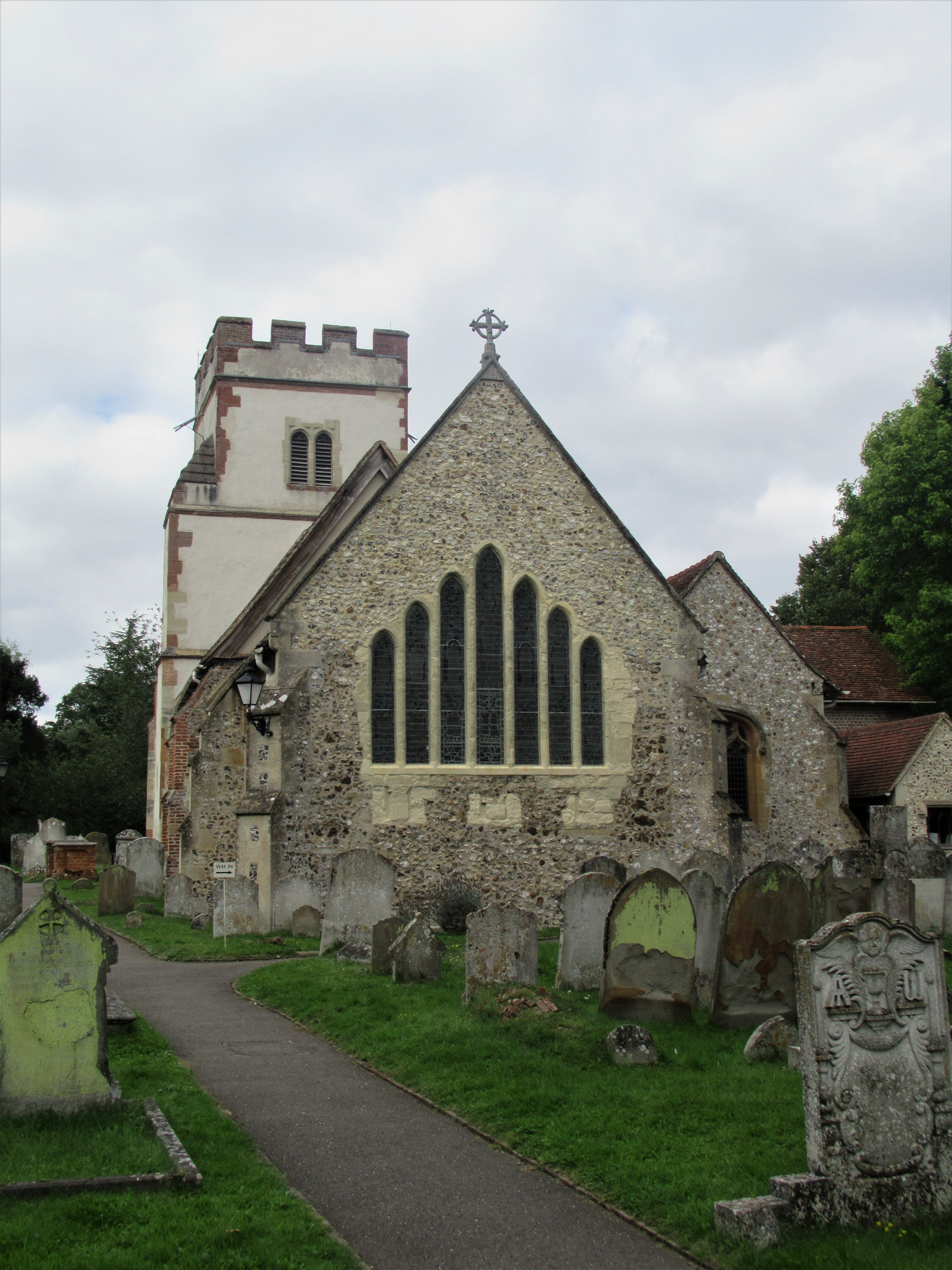
The church from the east.

The chancel and north aisle date from the 13th century. The east wall has a group of seven lancet windows, one of only two medieval instances in England. This window shows signs of being inserted, and it has been suggested that it may have come from the ruins of the nearby Newark Priory after the Dissolution. The south nave wall, with large traceried windows featuring 'Kentish' split cusps, is from the 14th century. Its tower and north aisle wall were added in the 15th century. A small chapel to the north, known as the King Chapel, was added in 1735.

== History ==
Ockham parish appears in the Domesday Book of 1086 as Bocheham. Held by Richard Fitz Gilbert, its domesday assets were: 1½ hides, 1 church, 2 fisheries worth 10d, 3 ploughs, 2 acres (0.81 ha) of meadow, woodland worth 60 hogs. It rendered £10 per year to its overlords.

The foundations of All Saints' Church were laid in the 12th century, and part of the nave was built then. The whole building was restored and enlarged in 1874-75 by Thomas Graham Jackson.

== King Chapel ==
The King Chapel was added in 1735 after the death of the 1st Baron King († 1734). The chapel is separated from the church aisle by a round headed, and there is a vaulted plaster ceiling springing from angle pilasters. Intended as a chapel over the family vault of the Lords King of Ockham and their descendants, the Earls of Lovelace, it features several church monuments, including

- Monument to Peter King, 1st Baron King, and his wife Anne Seys, sculpted by Michael Rysbrack (1734). On the north wall, white marble in Palladian style, with two figures sitting either side of large urn in front of pyramidal ground. Symbols of office surround Lord King.
- Monument to Walter Frilende, a priest († 1376). To the north side of the main altar, in the form of a brass tablet. This is the earliest priest's brass in Surrey.
- Monument to John Weston († 1483), also made of brass.
- Monument to the 7th Baron King († 1833), by Sir Richard Westmacott, in the form of a white marble bust.
- Funerary urn containing the ashes of the 2nd Earl of Lovelace († 1906) and those of Lady Mary Lovelace († 1941), in the form of a stone casket on monolithic pedestal with heraldic enamel plaques.

== Churchyard ==
There are several graves looked after by the Commonwealth War Graves Commission, and the church itself includes a memorial to those who gave their lives in the Great War and World War II.

== See also ==
- List of places of worship in Guildford (borough)
