= Wisley =

Coordinates: 51°19′23″N 0°28′37″W

- Village and civil parish
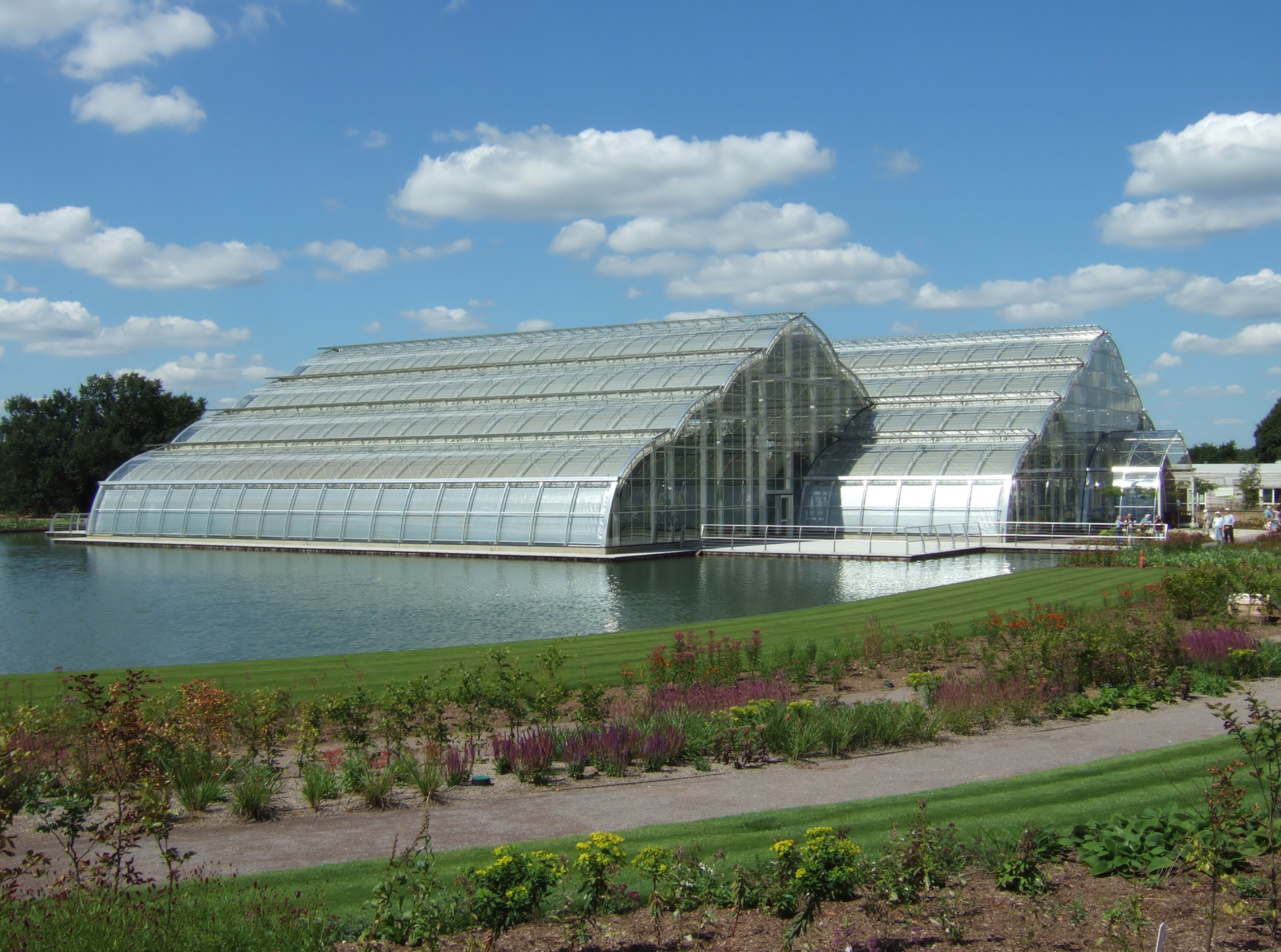
- The Wisley Glasshouse

- Location within Surrey
- Area: 4.03 km^{2} (1.56 sq mi)
- Population: 185 (Civil Parish 2011)
  - Density: 46/km^{2} (120/sq mi)
- OS grid reference: TQ0659
  - London: 20 miles (32 km)
- Civil parish: Wisley
- District: Guildford
- Shire county: Surrey
- Region: South East
- Country: England
- Sovereign state: United Kingdom
- Post town: WOKING
- Postcode district: GU23
- Dialling code: 01932
- Police: Surrey
- Fire: Surrey
- Ambulance: South East Coast
- UK Parliament: Guildford

Wisley /wɪzli/ is a village and civil parish in Surrey, England between Cobham and Woking, in the Borough of Guildford. It is the home of the Royal Horticultural Society's Wisley Garden. The River Wey runs through the village and Ockham and Wisley Commons form a large proportion of the parish on a high acid heathland, which is a rare soil type providing for its own types of habitat. It has a standard weather monitoring station, which has recorded some national record high temperatures.

== Etymology ==
Variant spellings of Wiselei (11th century) and Wyseleye (13th century) feature in the feet of fines and similar rolls at Westminster and Lambeth Palaces. The phoneme 'wiz' is typically a person's name and lea is another English word meaning meadow (not from Old French but from Old English, however with a similar Old French equivalent).

== Geography ==
Wisley gives its name to the nearby road intersection of the A3 Portsmouth Road (which runs across much land of the village) and the London Orbital M25 motorway, Junction 10. The village is equidistant between Cobham and Woking, in the Borough of Guildford. It is the home of the Royal Horticultural Society's Wisley Garden. The River Wey forms part of the western part of the village, but is partly on both banks within Pyrford. Ockham and Wisley Commons form a large proportion of the parish on a high acid heathland, which is a rare soil type providing for its own types of habitat.

=== Climate ===
==== 2006 heatwave ====
On 19 July 2006, the hottest temperature ever recorded in the month of July in the United Kingdom was recorded at Wisley, 36.5 °C (97.7 °F). This broke the record of 36.0 °C recorded in Epsom, Surrey on 22 July 1911.

However, on 1 July 2015, this record was beaten, with 36.7 °C (98.1 °F) at Heathrow Airport. The hottest day ever recorded in Wisley was 18 July 2022 when the temperature reached 39.3 °C (102.7 °F).

In summer 2026, the official weather station in Wisley recorded 62 consecutive days during which no rain fell at all, from 17 June to 17 August. On 18 August, 1.7mm of rain was recorded, ending the dry spell. This is one of the longest arid periods ever officially recorded in the UK, and easily the longest in the modern instrumental era, beating the stations previous longest dry spell of 36 days in 1976.

Climate data for Wisley (1991–2020 normals, extremes 1904-)
Month	Jan	Feb	Mar	Apr	May	Jun	Jul	Aug	Sep	Oct	Nov	Dec	Year
Record high °C (°F)	16.6 (61.9)	19.9 (67.8)	23.5 (74.3)	28.3 (82.9)	33.8 (92.8)	34.9 (94.8)	39.3 (102.7)	37.8 (100.0)	33.4 (92.1)	28.7 (83.7)	20.0 (68.0)	16.6 (61.9)	39.3 (102.7)
Mean daily maximum °C (°F)	8.3 (46.9)	8.8 (47.8)	11.6 (52.9)	14.9 (58.8)	18.2 (64.8)	21.1 (70.0)	23.3 (73.9)	22.9 (73.2)	19.9 (67.8)	15.6 (60.1)	11.3 (52.3)	8.7 (47.7)	15.4 (59.7)
Daily mean °C (°F)	5.3 (41.5)	5.5 (41.9)	7.5 (45.5)	9.8 (49.6)	12.8 (55.0)	15.8 (60.4)	17.9 (64.2)	17.6 (63.7)	14.9 (58.8)	11.6 (52.9)	7.9 (46.2)	5.6 (42.1)	11.0 (51.8)
Mean daily minimum °C (°F)	2.3 (36.1)	2.1 (35.8)	3.4 (38.1)	4.7 (40.5)	7.5 (45.5)	10.4 (50.7)	12.5 (54.5)	12.3 (54.1)	9.9 (49.8)	7.5 (45.5)	4.5 (40.1)	2.5 (36.5)	6.7 (44.1)
Record low °C (°F)	−15.1 (4.8)	−15.0 (5.0)	−12.2 (10.0)	−4.9 (23.2)	−3.0 (26.6)	0.1 (32.2)	2.2 (36.0)	1.2 (34.2)	−1.7 (28.9)	−5.7 (21.7)	−7.8 (18.0)	−14.0 (6.8)	−15.1 (4.8)
Average precipitation mm (inches)	65.3 (2.57)	48.8 (1.92)	40.6 (1.60)	45.8 (1.80)	46.6 (1.83)	47.1 (1.85)	49.3 (1.94)	57.0 (2.24)	53.6 (2.11)	74.4 (2.93)	73.4 (2.89)	66.1 (2.60)	667.9 (26.30)
Average precipitation days (≥ 1.0 mm)	11.7	9.8	8.6	9.0	8.5	8.0	7.2	8.6	8.1	11.2	11.9	11.6	114.1
Mean monthly sunshine hours	53.3	74.5	117.2	163.3	197.0	200.0	208.3	199.0	149.6	112.2	62.6	46.8	1,584
Source 1: Met Office
Source 2: Starlings Roost Weather

== History ==
=== Domesday Book ===
Wisley appears in the Domesday Book of 1086 as Wiselei. It was held by Osuuold (Oswold) [of Wotton], whose main seat was Wotton. Its domesday assets were: 1 1/2 hides; one church, one mill worth 10 shillings, three ploughs, one fishery worth 5d, 6 acres (2.4 ha) of meadow, woodland worth six hogs. It rendered £3 in the feudal system to its overlords per year.

There is a maintained medieval track running from Byfleet through Wisley to St Nicholas' Church, Pyrford.

=== Manorial descent ===
Oswold, lord of Wotton held the manor of Wisley when Domesday Book was compiled. The manor was subinfeudated by the later lords of Wotton. In the early 1200s, the manor passed from Roger de Somerey to Robert de Briwes, who leased it in 1243 to Walter le Basle and his wife Denise during Walter's life. On Robert's death in 1275, it passed to his son John, who settled it on his daughter Beatrice shortly before she married Robert Burnel. Around the end of the 1200s, Robert Fitz Payne came into possession of some of John's lands in Somerset, and apparently acquired title to Wisley as well, prevailing in a lawsuit initiated by Robert Burnel in 1328.

Fitz Payne died without male heirs; at the death of his wife Ela, in 1355, it passed to her cousin Robert, the second son of Richard de Grey, 2nd Baron Grey of Codnor. Robert assumed the Fitz Payne surname and died in 1392, when the manor passed to his daughter Isabel, wife of Richard Poynings, 3rd Baron Poynings. She died the following year, and it passed to her son and heir Robert Poynings, 4th Baron Poynings. In 1434, he settled the manor on his granddaughter Eleanor on the occasion of her marriage to Henry Percy, 3rd Earl of Northumberland. Eleanor died in 1483, and her successor, her son Henry Percy, 4th Earl of Northumberland, was killed in 1489. Towards the end of his life, a dispute arose among Northumberland and the other heirs of Sir Guy de Bryan (Robert Fitz Payne's father-in-law). One of these was Thomas Butler, 7th Earl of Ormond, who apparently received Wisley in the settlement between heirs, as he granted it to John Covert, who died in 1503.

Upon John's death without heirs male of the body, Wisley passed to his cousin Richard Covert, who in 1594 joined with his son Anthony in conveying the manor to the courtier Sir John Wolley and Elizabeth his wife, daughter of Sir William More. Wolley's son Francis inherited the manor in 1596, but died without legitimate issue in 1609. Wisley passed to Elizabeth's nephew Sir Arthur Mainwaring. Perhaps to pay for a lawsuit over guardianship of his niece, Mainwaring sold the manor to Sir Robert Parkhurst in 1641. Sir Robert died in 1651, and Wisley passed to his son Robert, who died in 1674. In 1677, his son, yet another Robert, sold Wisley and other Surrey estates bought from Mainwaring, including Pyrford, to Denzil Onslow.

Onslow died in 1721; upon the death of his widow Jane, in 1729, Wisley passed to his great-nephew Thomas Onslow, 2nd Baron Onslow. The manor descended with the peerage to George Onslow, 1st Earl of Onslow, who exchanged it with Peter King, 6th Baron King for Papworth in Send. It thereafter descended with that peerage (later the Earls of Lovelace).

=== 19th and 20th centuries ===
Slade Farm and a cottage were transferred from Wisley to Ockham 25 March 1883. The children of Wisley Common began to attend Byfleet School. Charles Buxton, brewer and MP, had Foxwarren Park, his solitary, stark Neo-Gothic mansion home placed upon the far woodlands of the heath, in land well within the orbital motorway of today and associated with Weybridge.

In 1911 it was recorded in the Victoria County History "there is no village of Wisley; merely some scattered farms and cottages".

The former Wisley Airfield, a misnomer as it was within the bounds of Ockham, next to the junction of the M25/A3, had a 6,691-foot (1.2672-mile) runway. Built towards the end of World War II as a flight test airfield for the Vickers aircraft factory at nearby Brooklands, it opened in 1944 and after extended use for the development of military aircraft during the Cold War, it finally closed in 1972.

Although the runway, taxiways and large areas of hardstanding survive, most of the buildings—including the unique control tower converted from an old timber-framed cottage—were demolished around 1980. The Ockham Beacon at the east end serves as a navigation aid for aircraft flying over the area.

=== Wisley Church ===
Wisley parish church was built by the Normans in the mid 12th century and the church has no later additions. Even the dedication of the church is lost.

Three consecration crosses still remain. There are remains of medieval frescos on the south wall of the nave and behind the pulpit. The chancel arch, of chalkstone, and both the north and south chancel windows are original. The roof with a queen post, and bellcote, with one bell, are later. A porch was added in the Stuart period. The Victorian restoration of 1872 reconstructed the western half in a neo-Norman style, including the two west windows, and added the vestry. Originally there was a Norman font, but that was replaced by the present Victorian one; the pulpit is also Victorian.

On the south wall is the Royal Arms of George III. The East window and north and south windows of the nave are late Gothic style from 1627. The stained-glass is by Powell and Sons, given in 1909 in memory of Mr and Mrs Buxton; Charles Buxton was a local M.P. Beside the pulpit is a scrolled iron Elizabethan hour-glass holder. One pew is dated 1630, but the remainder are Victorian, and the panel behind the organ is from 1915.

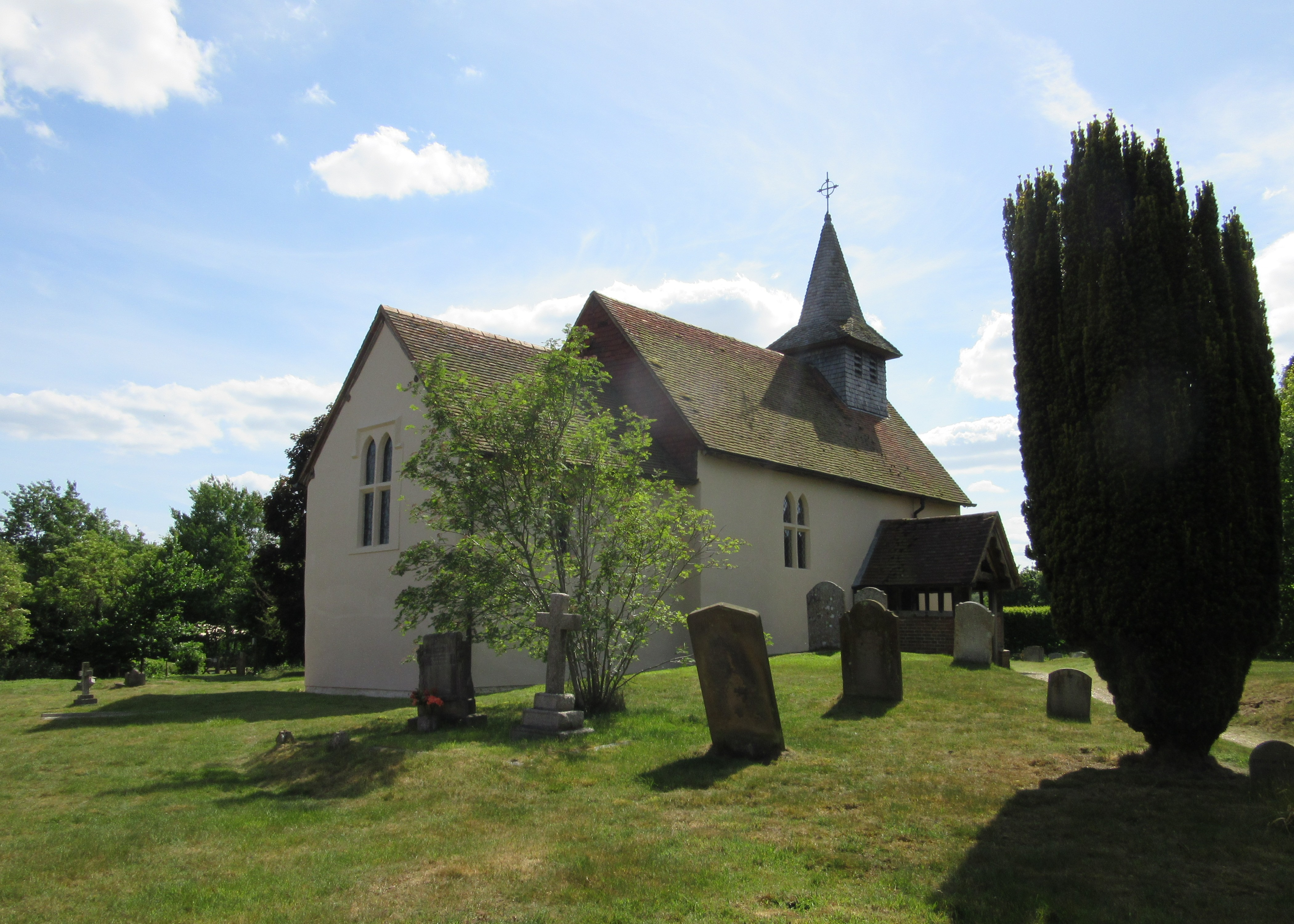

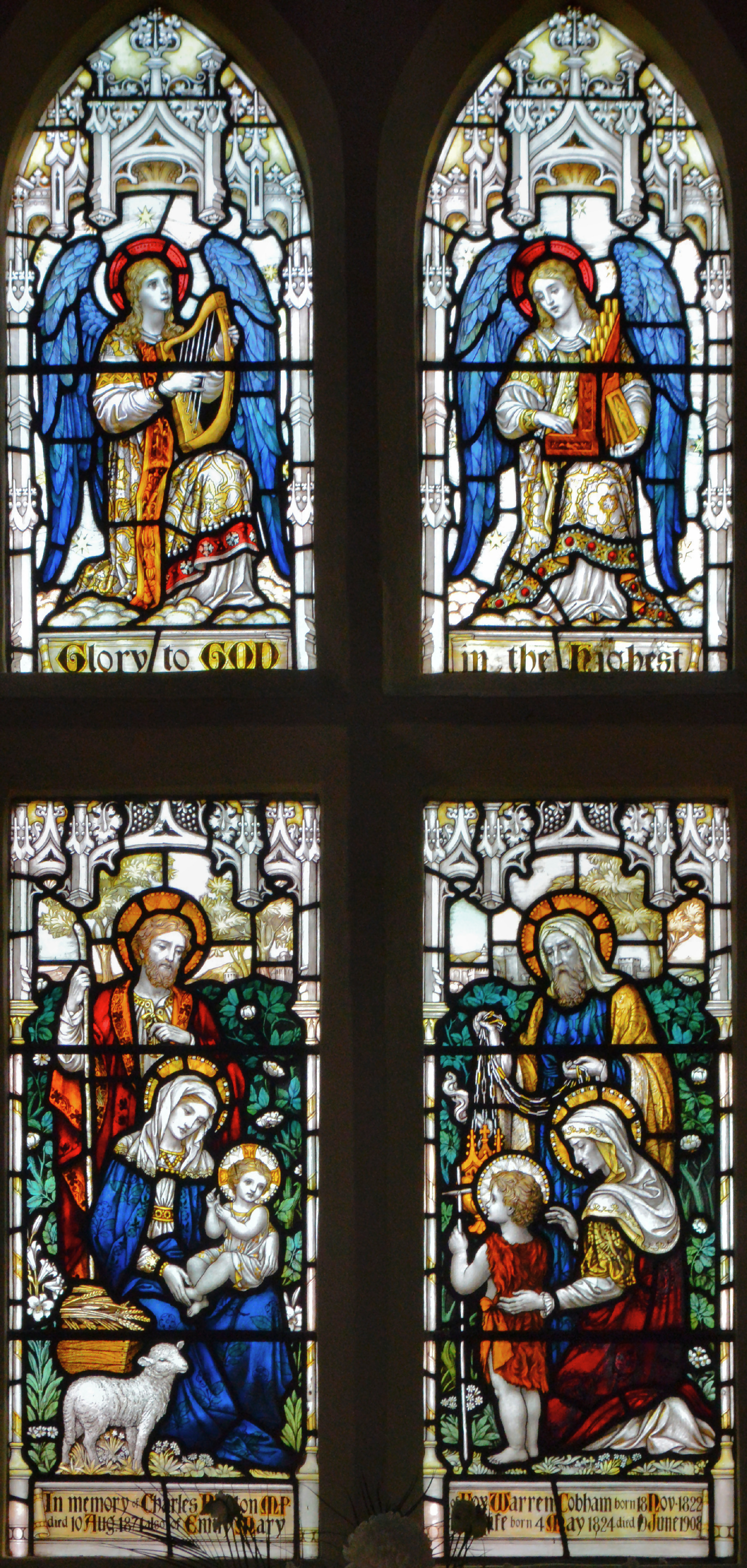

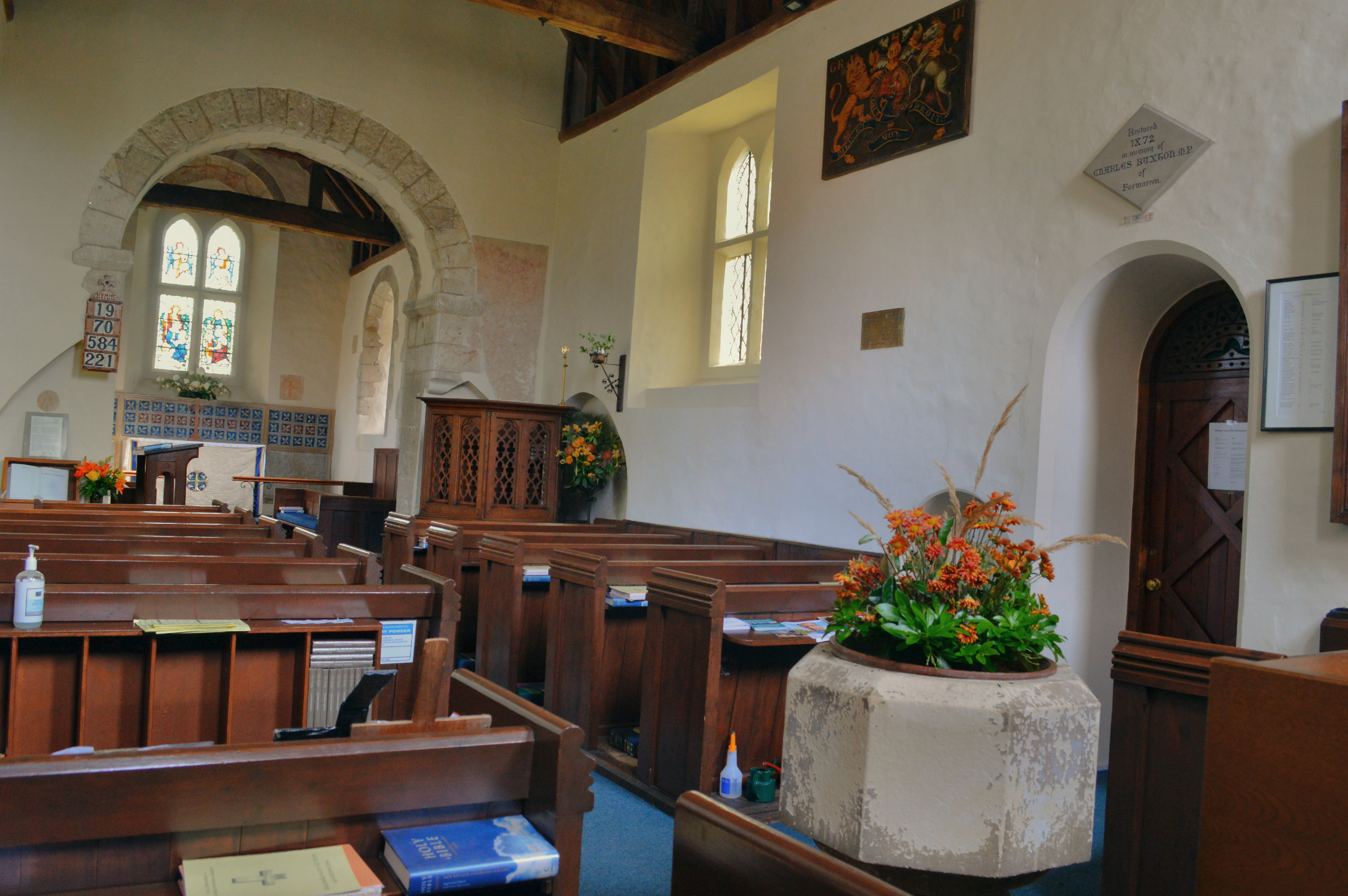

== Amenities ==
The 27-hole Wisley Golf Club opened in 1991.

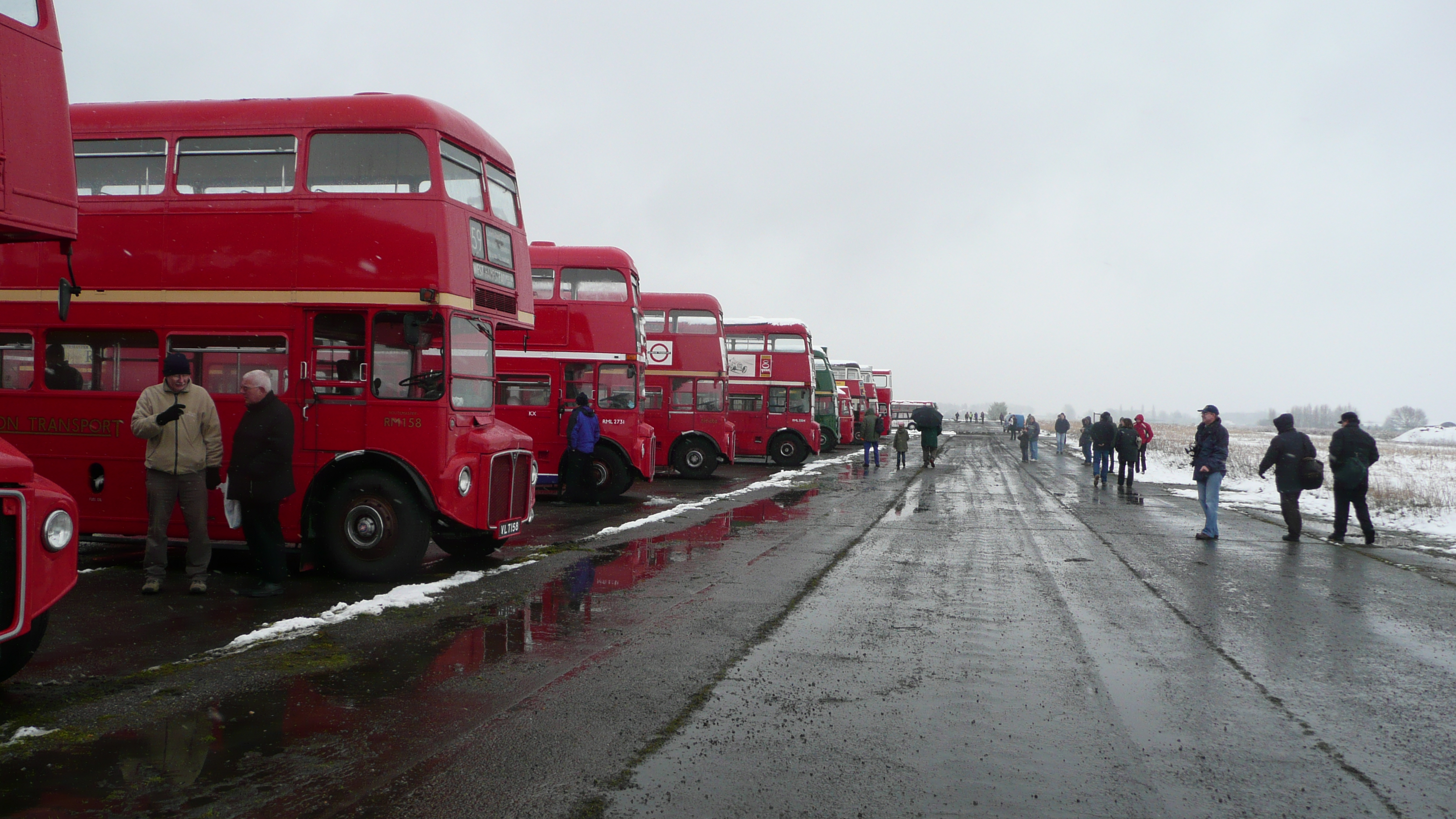
In mid-winter, a line of AEC Routemasters at a Cobham Bus Museum rally on the runway at a snowy Wisley Airfield.

== Demography and housing ==
2011 Census Homes
Output area	Detached	Semi-detached	Terraced	Flats and apartments	Caravans/temporary/mobile homes	shared between households
(Civil Parish)	22	34	5	19	3	0

The average level of accommodation in the region composed of detached houses was 28%, the average that was apartments was 22.6%.

2011 Census Key Statistics
Output area	Population	Households	% Owned outright	% Owned with a loan	hectares
(Civil Parish)	185	83	10.8%	9.6%	403

The proportion of households in the civil parish who owned their home outright compares to the regional average of 35.1%. The proportion who owned their home with a loan compares to the regional average of 32.5%. The remaining % is made up of rented dwellings (plus a negligible % of households living rent-free).
