= Downside, Surrey =

Village in Surrey, England

Coordinates: 51°18′42″N 0°24′34″W

Downside
- Village
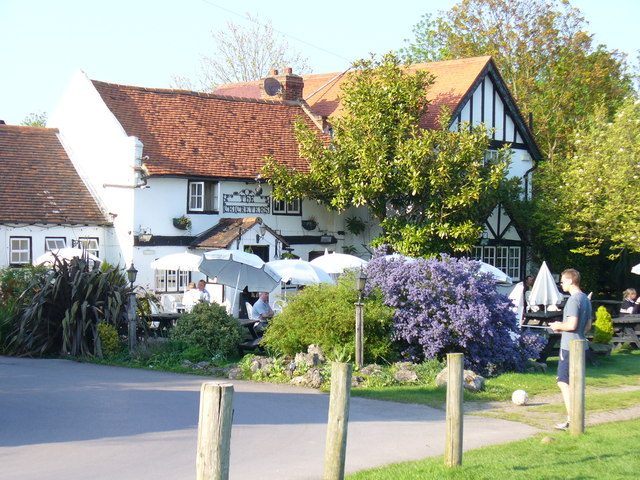
- The Cricketers' Inn, Downside

- Location within Surrey
- Population: 6,564 (2011 Census. Cobham and Downside Ward)
- OS grid reference: TQ109581
- District: Elmbridge
- Shire county: Surrey
- Region: South East
- Country: England
- Sovereign state: United Kingdom
- Post town: Cobham
- Postcode district: KT11
- Dialling code: 01932
- Police: Surrey
- Fire: Surrey
- Ambulance: South East Coast
- UK Parliament: Esher and Walton

Downside is a small village in the English county of Surrey, in the local government district of Elmbridge, centred on Downside Common which is 18 miles (29 km) southwest of London and 8.4 miles (13.5 km) northeast of Guildford. Most of its buildings form a cluster. It has an inn, Downside Sports and Social Club, regular village hall events and an annual sports day. It is in the Cobham and Downside ward of Elmbridge Borough Council.

== History ==
=== Toponymy ===
The village was a tything (an ancient administrative division represented by an assembly of households within an area comprising ten hides). Downe Place was the home of the Downe (or Adowne) family for many generations, from at least the 12th century. H. E. Malden followed E. W. Brayley in deriving the locality name "Downside" from the family, but T. E. C. Walker more credibly derived the family's name from the location, referring to the hill or down near the river on that side of Cobham. That house was later also known as "Downe Hall".

=== Early history ===
In 1331 the prior and convent of Newark by Guildford acquired 100 acres (40 ha) from John Prudhomme held of Henry de Somerbury, who held of Henry atte Downe, who held of Chertsey Abbey. The historian David Taylor shows that the old Downe Place probably stood near Downside Farm, and not on the site of the Cobham Park mansion.

Much of the village green was part of a common open to those with villager status of the Downeside Tything as opposed to the two others: Street Cobham and Church Cobham. As to the manors that were in private hands in the Middle Ages, see the parish of Cobham, as Downside's chapel was built on land in Cobham ecclesiastical parish.

Neither of the settlements is a civil parish and the church became tied with that of Ockham at an unknown date after its 19th-century construction.

Downside Village was designated as a Conservation Area in 1979, centred on its developed, village green area.

== Geography ==
A rural community, Downside (and the adjacent hamlet of Hatchford) is situated in open countryside between Cobham to the north and East Horsley to the south, Stoke D'Abernon to the east and two similar size settlements across the Surrey Wildlife Trust expanse of Wisley Heath and Ockham Common: Ockham and Wisley to the west. London is 18 miles (29 km) northeast, Guildford is 8.4 miles (13.5 km) southwest. Local administrative centre of Elmbridge, Esher /ˈiːʃər/, is 4.4 miles (7.1 km) NNE.

This elevated community is part of the Green Belt. Immediately to the south of the village is the M25 motorway, where construction of a motorway service station began, despite determined local opposition, in 2011. To the north is Cobham Park, a large country house that has been converted to apartments.

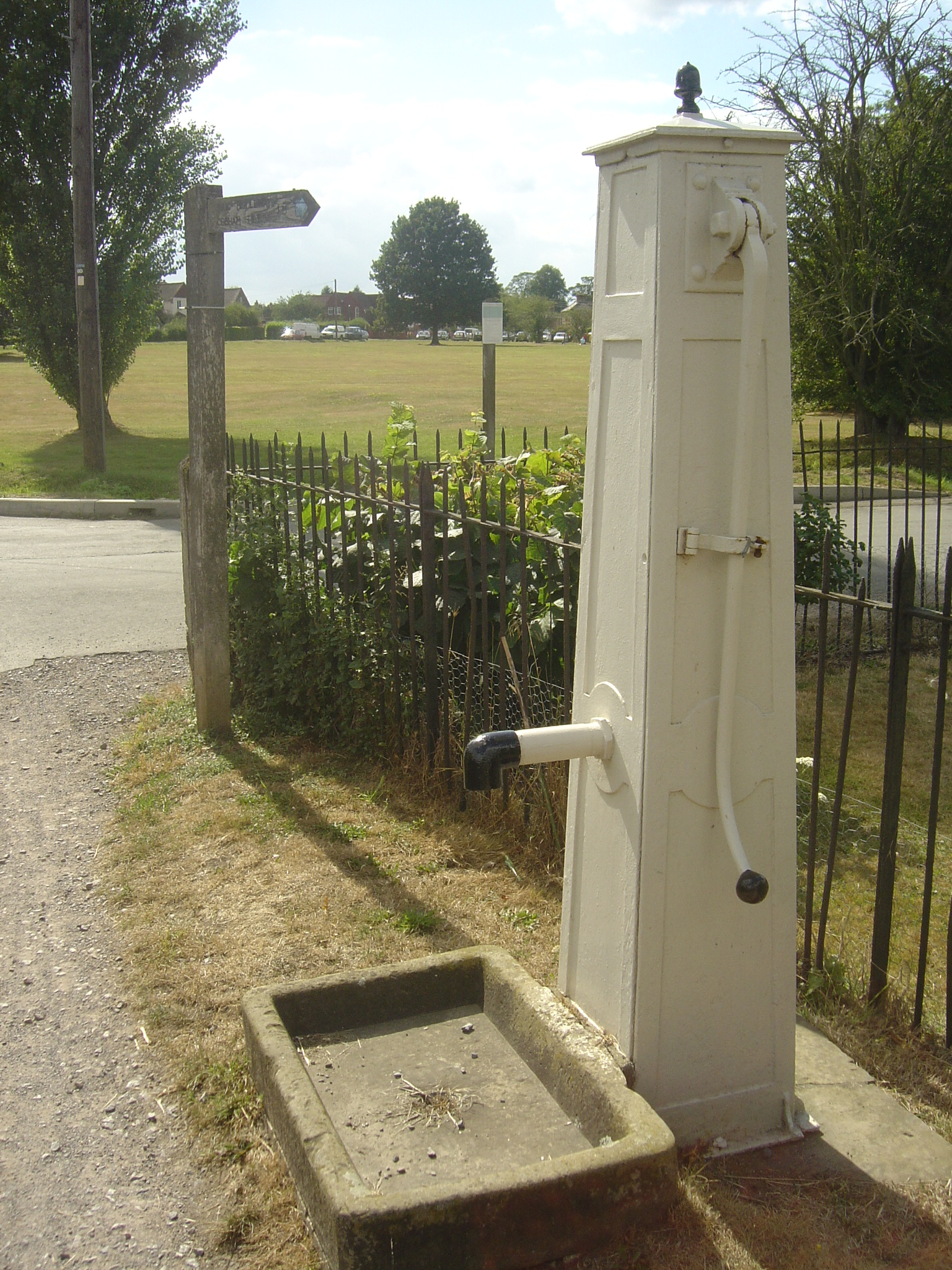
The village water pump

Downside has a large village green, on the northern edge of which is the Cricketers' Inn, dating at its core to the 17th century and a Grade II listed building. Immediately off the green in the south east corner is a listed hand-operated water pump.

=== Elevations, soils and geology ===
Elevations of the central part of Downside, on all sides of the Common vary from 36 metres (118 ft) AOD in the southwest to 27 metres (89 ft) Above Ordnance Datum in the northeast, while the common itself ranges between 29-33m AOD. Immediately north of this the River Mole begins to cut a valley and in Cobham, most of which, excluding Fairmile is at 18-22m AOD.

Not within the narrow belt of raised soils of the north Surrey belt of acidic, sandy raised heathland of the Bagshot Formation, the soil stretching from Cobham and Downside as far as Effingham and for a more considerable distance east and southwest is "slowly permeable loamy/clayey slightly acid but base-rich soil", which gives rise to flora of trees, grasses and crops or which can be cultivated easily. As the later sandy soil mentioned above and certainly further chalk overlayers have been washed away, whereas sand may have been scant, hence why it appears further north; the geology of Downside is Cretaceous: i.e. Hastings Beds, Weald Clay, then pleistocene Folkestone and then covered by a considerable remaining layer of Claygate Beds, Gault Clay mixed in with some eroded limestone from the north downs in the soil to the south.

== Demography ==
In 2001, the central output area of Downside contained 306 residents in 126 households, of which 11.4% were aged over 65; 6.0% of the population were in full-time further education; 70.6% of those of working age were economically active whereas 0.0% were unemployed, 11.7%

As to ethnicity, 89.5% of the population identified themselves as being White British ethnicity, 2.0% as of White Irish ethnicity and 8.5% as White Other of the categories available.

In terms of religion, 76.0%% of the population responded as being Christian, 1.3% as Jewish, 16.4% as atheist and 6.2% declined to answer.

Downside's economy is predominantly a service sector economy reflected by the lowest versus the upper end of the official categorisation table of occupation given, compiled from the 2001 census:

| Category | Number of adults in category in 2001 | Percentage of those aged 16–74 |
|---|---|---|
| Elementary occupations | 24 | 14.9% |
| Managers and Senior Officials | 44 | 27.4% |
| Professional Occupations | 15 | 9.3% |
| Skilled Trades Occupations | 23 | 14.3% |
| Administrative and Secretarial Occupations | 16 | 9.9% |
| Associate Professional and Technical Occupations | 6 | 3.7% |

== Religion ==
St Michael's Chapel by the village green serves the village's Church of England community and those seeking its help in the Diocese of Guildford, at the end of the only fully developed street.

== Culture and community ==
Downside Sports & Social Club operate with a mixture of cricket, bowls, football and entertainment. Downside Village Hall hosts voluntary-run classes and meetings for local groups and organisations.

Downside village green, historically and legally Downside Common, is the setting for the Downside & Hatchford Sports Day, held annually on August Bank Holiday Monday.

== Education ==
St. Matthew's Church of England Infant School serves the wider area of Downside including Cobham.
