= Ockham, Surrey =

Village and parish in Surrey, England

Coordinates: 51°17′53″N 0°27′40″W

Ockham
- Village
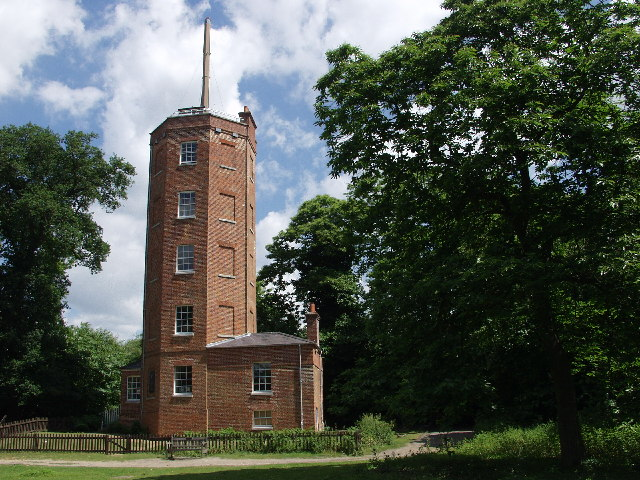
- The Semaphore Tower rises from high Ockham and Wisley Commons at Chatley Heath

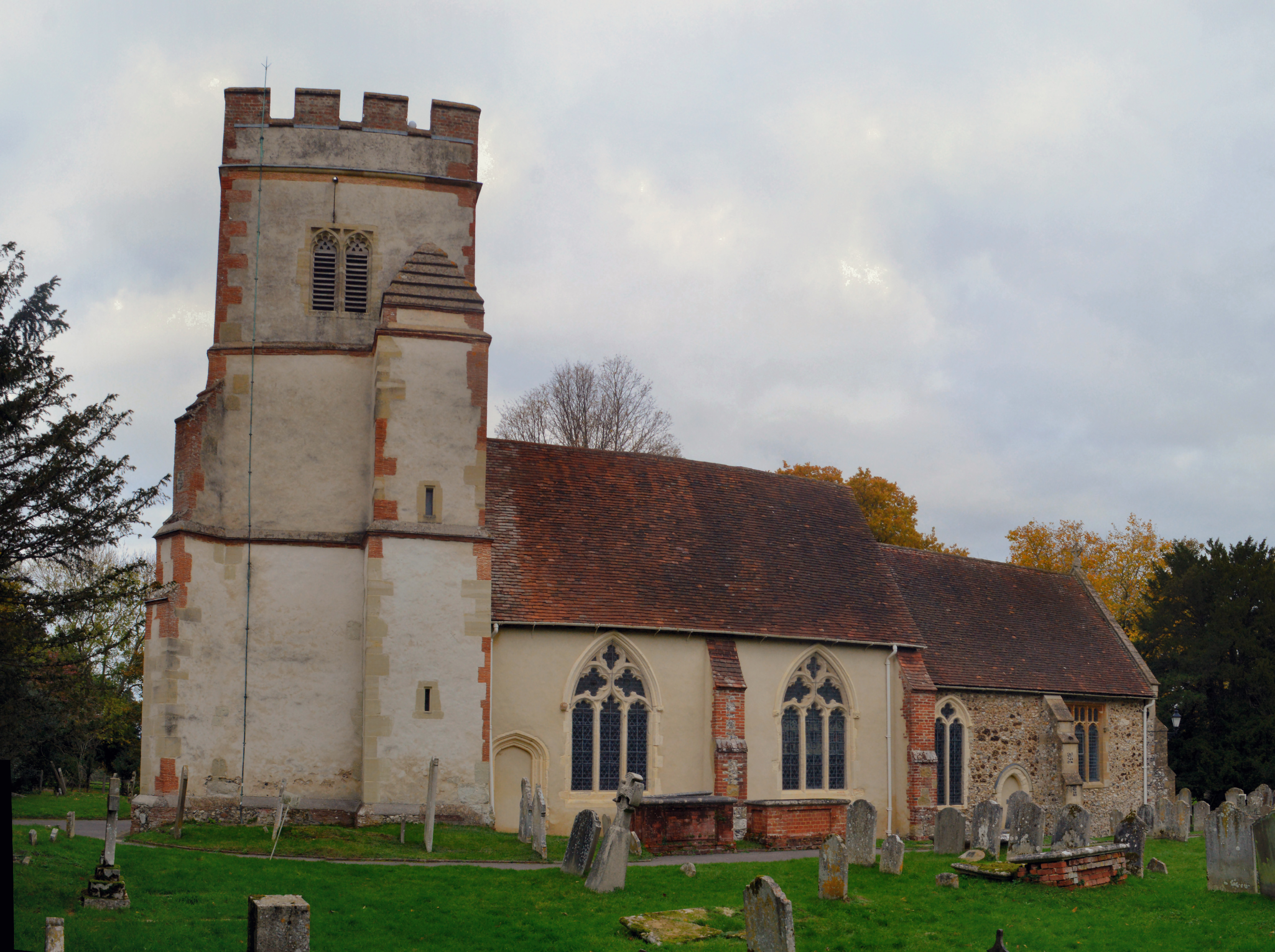
- All Saints' Much of the church dates to the middle of the Middle Ages.

- Location within Surrey
- Area: 12.13 km^{2} (4.68 sq mi)
- Population: 410 (civil parish, 2011)
  - Density: 34/km^{2} (88/sq mi)
- OS grid reference: TQ0756
- District: Guildford
- Shire county: Surrey
- Region: South East
- Country: England
- Sovereign state: United Kingdom
- Post town: WOKING
- Postcode district: GU23
- Dialling code: 01483
- Police: Surrey
- Fire: Surrey
- Ambulance: South East Coast
- UK Parliament: Guildford

Ockham (/ˈɒkəm/ OK-əm) is a rural and semi-rural village in the borough of Guildford in Surrey, England. The village starts immediately east of the A3 but the lands extend to the River Wey in the west where it has a large mill-house. Ockham is between Cobham (near Leatherhead) and East Horsley (near Guildford).

== History ==
Ockham has been occupied since at least the middle Bronze Age (c. 1500–1100 BC), evidenced by the so-called 'Ockham Hoard', a collection of bronze-age objects discovered in 2013 during building works at the former Hautboy Inn, as well as the existence of a relatively uncommon bell barrow on Cockcrow Hill.

Ockham appears in the Domesday Book of 1086 as Bocheham. Held by Richard Fitz Gilbert, its Domesday assets were: 1½ hides, 1 church, 2 fisheries worth 10d, 3 ploughs, 2 acres (0.81 ha) of meadow, woodland worth 60 hogs. It rendered £10 per year to its overlords.

Through the Middle Ages in the many records nationally (such as Assize Rolls and feet of fines), Ockham features no high nobles among its owners. However it is the birthplace of William of Ockham, the famous medieval philosopher and the proponent of Occam's razor.

Byron's daughter, Ada Lovelace, lived briefly at Ockham Park before settling at Horsley Towers, which her husband the 1st Earl of Lovelace built in the village of East Horsley. His forefather Sir Peter King bought the manor using an Act of Parliament to cement the deal from the long-standing lords of the manor the Weston family of Albury, Send in Surrey, and of Sussex, who had acquired the manor from distant cousins who since their late Tudor period forebear, Francis Weston, owned it along with Sutton Place, Surrey in the extreme south of the parish of Woking.

An act of charity in the village assisted one family in the 'Underground Railroad' in the US that resulted from the Fugitive Slave Act of 1850. After reaching Liverpool in 1850, following an arduous journey starting with a flight to freedom from Macon, Georgia, African-American slaves Ellen and William Craft were given a home by a parishioner in Ockham in 1851. They attended the Ockham School, and paid for their education by working as teachers: William giving instruction in carpentry, and Ellen in sewing. In 1852 their first child, Charles Estlin Phillips Craft, was born in Ockham. One year later, they left Ockham and returned to London. In 1871, after returning to Georgia, they started the Woodville Co-Operative Farm School, modelled after the Ockham School.

== Geology ==
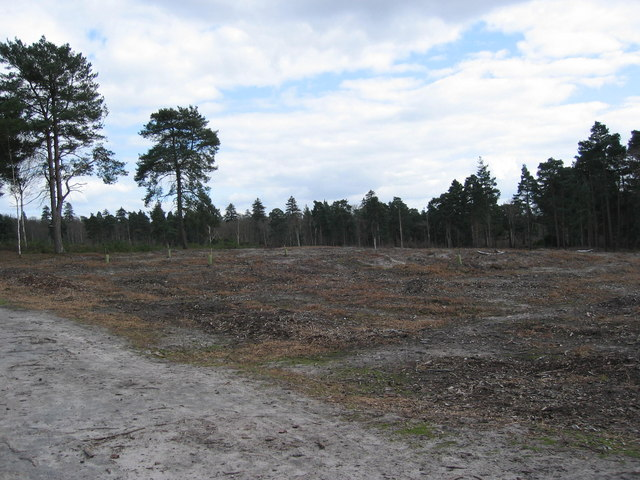
Ockham and Wisley Commons support rare species in their nationally rare soil type, acid, naturally wet sandy heath and bog soil.

The soil of Ockham Common varies between fertile light clay and humus topsoil to highly acidic, sandy heath. In the north is the high, uneroded Bagshot Sand. The southern part of the parish is on the London Clay. Part of the Wey Valley in the west of the parish and the banks of a stream which joins it from the east are particularly formed from alluvium.

== Landmarks ==
=== Chatley Heath and its semaphore tower ===
The tall, narrow, octagonal tower dates to the early 19th century when the Napoleonic Wars were raging. It was used for signalling by semaphore.

=== Ockham mill ===
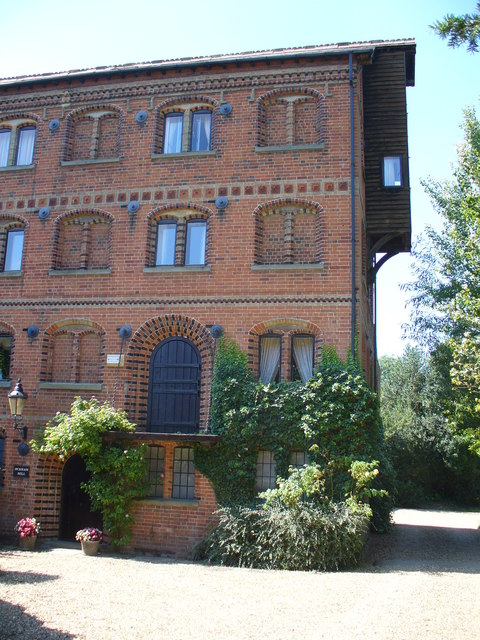
Ockham Mill, one of a cluster of three buildings close to Wisley

One of the largest formerly industrial millhouses on the Wey, comparable to the converted mills in Old Woking and that of Stoke Mill, Guildford, Ockham mill is dated 1862 and is a Grade II listed building. It is of four storeys red stock brick with decorative brick and tile bands over each floor. Providing unusual quirkiness, it has brick-dentilled eaves over its third 3 first floor and one of its windows is considered "Lovelace style", i.e. with deeply inlaid recess as in the East Horsley walls of the memorials to the Earl of Lovelace.

=== Wisley Airfield on Ockham Common ===
Ockham Common, to the north-east of the village, is the site of the disused Wisley Airfield, which has a paved 2 km (1.2 mi) runway (RWY 10/28). As late as 1972, this airfield was in service as a satellite fit-out and flight test centre for Vickers and latterly the British Aircraft Corporation, linked to their main factory and airfield at nearby Brooklands, Weybridge, capable of taking aircraft as large as the VC10.

Although the airfield is disused, the aviation connection remains: it is the location of OCK, a VOR navigational beacon which is the holding facility for south westerly arrivals into London Heathrow Airport.

=== All Saints' Church ===
Ockham has a small church, All Saints'. It is a Grade I listed building. The foundations were laid in the 12th century, and part of the nave was built then. The chancel and north aisle date from the 13th century, the south nave wall from the 14th century, and the tower and north aisle wall from the 15th century. In 1735, the King Chapel was added to the church as north wing. Intended as a chapel over the family vault of the Lords King and their descendants, the Earls of Lovelace, it features several church monuments. All Saints' Church building was restored and enlarged in 1874–1875 by Thomas Graham Jackson. There is also a memorial to those who gave their lives in the Great War and World War II.

=== Martyrs Green ===
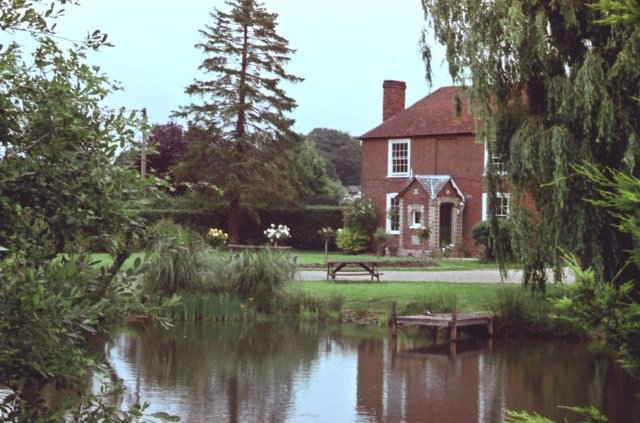
This farmhouse in Martyrs Green demonstrates the fertile soil of part of the parish

This small linear settlement is a hamlet to the east of the village, near Downside and Cobham. It has the village's only pub; The Black Swan.

== Sports ==
Ockham has cricket and football clubs that play at weekends at Hautboy Meadows on Ockham Lane. The cricket club has two teams in the Surrey Downs League and a Sunday friendly (matches) only side. The football club are in the Guildford & Woking Alliance.

Ockham was also the headquarters for the Tyrrell Formula One racing team, until its sale to British American Racing in 1997 and subsequent move to Brackley, Northamptonshire.

== Demography and housing ==
2011 Census Homes
Output area	Detached	Semi-detached	Terraced	Flats and apartments	Caravans/temporary/mobile homes	shared between households
(Civil Parish)	92	53	12	5	2	0

The average level of accommodation in the region composed of detached houses was 28%, the average that was apartments was 22.6%.

2011 Census Key Statistics
Output area	Population	Households	% Owned outright	% Owned with a loan	hectares
(Civil Parish)	410	164	41.5%	32.9%	1213

The proportion of households in the civil parish who owned their home outright compares to the regional average of 35.1%. The proportion who owned their home with a loan compares to the regional average of 32.5%. The remaining % is made up of rented dwellings (plus a negligible % of households living rent-free).

== Namesakes ==
The village gave its name to HMS Ockham, a Ham class minesweeper.
