= Notre Dame School, Surrey =

Independent Catholic school in Cobham, Surrey, England

Notre Dame School

Location
- Cobham, Surrey, KT11 1HA; England; 51°20′30″N 0°25′28″W

Information
- Type: Private day school
- Motto: Ad maiorem Dei gloriam To the greater glory of God
- Religious affiliation: Roman Catholic
- Established: 1937
- Founders: The Company of Our Lady Mary
- Department for Education URN: 125375 Tables
- Chair of Governors: Gerald Russell
- Headmistress: Anna King (Senior School) Amélie Morgan (Prep School)
- Gender: Girls
- Age: 2 to 18
- Enrolment: 650 (approx.)
- Houses: 4
- Colours: Blue and yellow
- Website: www.notredame.co.uk

Notre Dame School is an independent Catholic girls day school located in Cobham, Surrey, England. The school includes both a preparatory school and a senior school.

== History ==
Notre Dame School was founded at Burwood House in 1938 by nuns from the Company of Our Lady Mary. In 2003 the school’s ownership passed from The Company of Mary Our Lady to a charitable trust, and is now managed by the trustees and a board of governors, several of whom are Sisters from the religious institute. The present school headmistress was appointed in 2026.

=== Anniversary ===
Cardinal Cormac Murphy-O'Connor, Archbishop of Westminster, was the main celebrant at a special Mass held at the school to celebrate both the 70th anniversary of the school and 400 years of the Company of Mary Our Lady on Tuesday 15 May 2007. The Mass was also attended by Archbishop Faustino Sainz Muñoz, Apostolic Nuncio, Bishop Kieran Conry and Bishop Bernard Longley.

== Preparatory School ==
Notre Dame Preparatory School
- Cobham, Surrey, KT11 1HA; England

Information
- Type: Preparatory school
- Religious affiliation: Roman Catholic
- Department for Education URN: 125447 Tables
- Headmistress: Amélie Morgan
- Gender: Girls; Boys (aged 2-4)
- Age: 2 to 11
- Website: www.notredame.co.uk/prep

The prep department consists of the NDEY Early Years for boys and girls aged 2 to 4, Infant school for boys and girls aged 4 – 7 and the junior school for girls aged 7–11.

== Senior School ==
Notre Dame Senior School
- Cobham, Surrey, KT11 1HA; England

Information
- Type: Independent school (United Kingdom)
- Religious affiliation: Roman Catholic
- Department for Education URN: 125447 Tables
- Headmistress: Anna King
- Gender: Girls (aged 11-18)
- Age: 11 to 18
- Website: www.notredame.co.uk/senior-school

The Senior School consists of secondary education for girls aged 11–16 and ND6 Sixth form for girls ages 16–18

== Houses ==
The pupils of both schools are divided into four Houses, which compete in such things as sport and drama. The Houses are named as follows:

- Jeanne (Prep) Eyquem (Senior)
- Michel (Prep) Montaigne (Senior)
- Richard (Prep) Lestonnac (Senior)
- Gaston (Prep) Montferrant (Senior)

== Associations ==
The school has membership of the Girls' Schools Association, the Incorporated Association of Preparatory Schools and the Catholic Independent Schools' Conference.

== Notable former pupils ==
- Patsy Ferran Olivier Award - Best actress
- Jenny Griffiths Software entrepreneur
- Ruth Wilson, Olivier Award - winning actress
