= Oakham (disambiguation) =

Oakham is the county town of Rutland, East Midlands, England.

Oakham may also refer to:

- Oakham, Massachusetts, a town in Worcester County, Massachusetts, United States
- Oakham, West Midlands, an area of Dudley, England
- Oakham Rural District, a former rural district in Rutland, England
- Oakham Canal, a canal that ran from Oakham, Rutland to Melton Mowbray in Leicestershire
- Oakham, a mansion and plantation house in Warren County, Tennessee, United States

== See also ==
- Ockham (disambiguation)
