= Ockham Park =

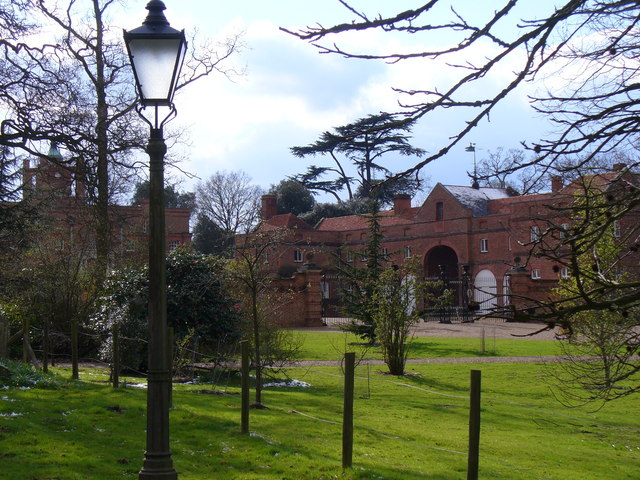
- Ockham Park House and stables

- Location within Surrey
- 51°17′52″N 0°28′24″W
- Type: Country house
- Location: Ockham, Surrey

History
- Built: c. 1638
- Rebuilt: 1728–1729

Listed Building – Grade II*
- Official name: Ockham Park House
- Designated: 14 June 1967
- Reference no.: 1029400

Listed Building – Grade II*
- Official name: Stables to Ockham Park House
- Designated: 14 June 1967
- Reference no.: 1188468

Listed Building – Grade II*
- Official name: Orangery to Ockham Park
- Designated: 14 June 1967
- Reference no.: 1377806

Ockham Park is a seventeenth-century English country house in Ockham, Surrey.

The house is a square two-storey block in red brick with 7 bays on each side with a hipped tiled roof. The nearby two-storey stable block is grade II* listed and now converted into flats.

== History ==
Built c.1638 for the Weston family as their new manor house, it was altered in 1727–9 to designs by Nicholas Hawksmoor for Lord King, the Lord Chancellor, created 1st Baron King in 1725.

In the 1830s it was extended in Italianate style for the seventh Lord King. His son William was elevated to an earldom as the Earl of Lovelace and lived here with his wife Ada Lovelace. The house remained in the hands of the family until it was gutted by fire in 1948.

The fire left the orangery, stable block, kitchen wing, and a solitary Italianate tower. The estate of 4,984 acres (2,017 ha) was in part made public once again insofar as it contributed back to Ockham and Wisley Commons but otherwise was auctioned on 21 October 1958. The surviving buildings, in part, were restored in the 1970s.

== Depictions ==
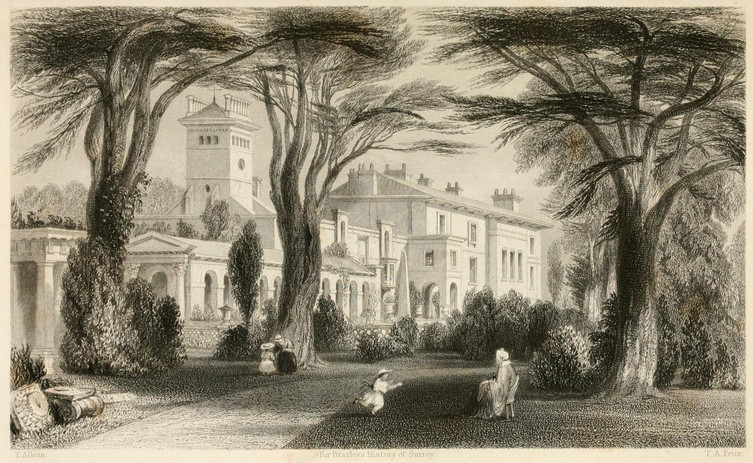
Ockham Park, Surrey, c. 1850

A steel intaglio engraving "Ockham Park, seat of the Right Hon. the Earl of Lovelace" by T. A. Prior after a painting by T. Allom, was used in print for in E.W. Brayley's A Topographical History of Surrey (1850).
