= Jenny Griffiths =

British software engineer turned entrepreneur

Jenny Griffiths is the founder and CEO of Snap Vision. She is a software engineer turned entrepreneur.

She has been featured on the Europe's and World's Top 50 Women in Tech 2018 by Forbes lists. She was appointed MBE for Services to Innovation in 2015, and in 2019 was awarded the Royal Academy of Engineering's Silver Medal for contributions to UK engineering. She has also been selected in Drapers 30 Under 30 and Forbes European list in the "Consumer Technology" category 2016.

== Education ==
She attended Notre Dame School, Surrey, then took Computer Science at the University of Bristol, graduating in 2009. She won the New Enterprise Competition at the university.

== Career ==
After graduating, Griffiths worked as a project manager at a cyber-security firm while developing Snap Vision, a visual search engine, and later turned it into Snap Fashion, an app and a website. She kept on working as a project manager until 2012 when she quit to take her business Snap Fashion. Snap Fashion became Snap Vision when she started licensing the technology to other businesses beyond her original app and website.

Snap Vision is a visual search platform which licenses technologies to publishers and retailers to improve product discoverability make images shoppable. They have licensed technology to Westfield and Time Inc, and won Oracle's marketing innovation award for their technology.

Her original application, Snap Fashion is an app and website that allows shoppers to find the clothes they like based on a picture. The app searches for matching outfit and compares prices from the database of retailers. In 2019, the database included more than 110 retailers. On the other hand, the Snap Fashion InStore tool aimed at taking the visual search concept into the fitting rooms of High Street stores. The app would provide consumer advice regarding fashion, clothing and clothing accessories by asking a set of questions to someone trying clothes in the fitting room.

From graduation, 2009, until 2012, she struggled to find attention and funding. Although fashion magazines liked it, most male-centric tech publication did not show interest. Griffiths said “Technology wise, it was hard to get noticed, probably because we are a female-based product”. It changed when she won BIG, the British Innovation Gateway Award, an annual contest organized by CISCO offering money prize and marketing, public relations and legal support in addition to a year mentorship.

In 2016, she was awarded a £1 million contract under Innovate UK's re-imagining the High Street' SBRI (Small Business Research Initiative) programme to create Snap InStore and raised £2 million in the company's Series A round of financing. Snap Fashion was Time Inc.’s first venture capital investment outside of the US. She has since raised further rounds of finance to continue to grow the business.

The technology won awards at competitions such as

- Winner, Re-imagining the High St - SBRI & TSB Funding Competition, 2014
- Winner, UK Mobile & App Design Awards - SBRI & TSB Funding Competition, 2014
- Creative Entrepreneur of the Year 2013 - British Council & The Guardian, 2013
- 23rd Most Influential Woman in UK IT 2013 - Computer Weekly, 2013
- Winner - Young Guns 5 to Watch - Young Guns / Growing Business, 2013
- Future 50 Entrepreneur - Ernst&Young
- Winner - Cisco British Innovation Gateway Awards - Cisco, 2012
- Winner - Decoded Fashion, 2012 - Decoded Fashion
- Winner - Future 50 Competition - Red Bull and Real Business Magazine, 2011
- Winner - Tech City Launchpad Competition - Technology Strategy Board, 2011
- Winner - New Enterprise Competition - University of Bristol, 2009

Griffiths said that she has been called an ambassador for women in tech.

She renamed her company from Snap Fashion to SnapTech in 2016, and to Snap Vision in 2020, and currently offers 9 different products.

== Awards ==
- 2009: MBE for services to digital innovation in the fashion industry.
- 2012: Cisco British Innovation Award
- 2014: British Council's Creative Entrepreneur of the Year.
- 2015: MBE for Services to Innovation in the Digital Fashion Industry
- 2019: Royal Academy of Engineering Silver Medal
