= Cobham, Surrey =

Village in the Borough of Elmbridge in Surrey, England

Coordinates: 51°19′44″N 0°24′32″W

Cobham
- Village
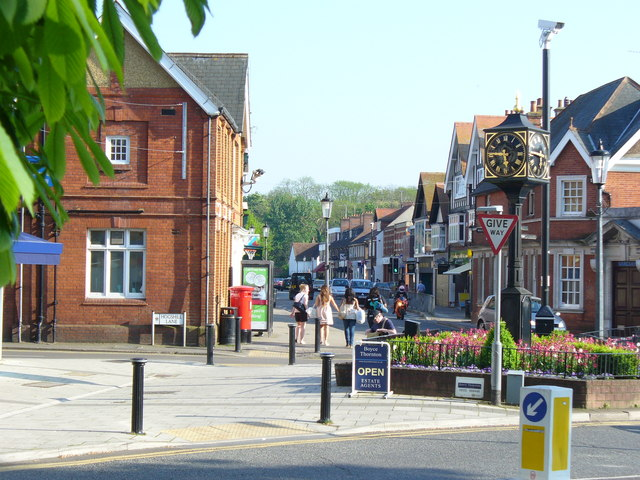
- Street off the High Street leading to the parish church

- Location within Surrey
- Area: 8.29 km^{2} (3.20 sq mi)
- Population: 9,739 (2011 census) or 17,273 as Built-up Area including Oxshott
  - Density: 1,175/km^{2} (3,040/sq mi)
- OS grid reference: TQ1160
  - London: 17 mi (27 km)
- Civil parish: n/a
- District: Elmbridge
- Shire county: Surrey
- Region: South East
- Country: England
- Sovereign state: United Kingdom
- Post town: Cobham
- Postcode district: KT11
- Dialling code: 01932
- Police: Surrey
- Fire: Surrey
- Ambulance: South East Coast
- UK Parliament: Runnymede and Weybridge

Cobham (/ˈkɒbəm/) is a large village in the Borough of Elmbridge in Surrey, England, centred 17 miles (27 km) south-west of London and 10 miles (16 km) northeast of Guildford on the River Mole. It has a commercial/services High Street, a significant number of primary and private schools and Painshill Park, an 18th century landscape garden.

== Toponymy ==
Cobham appears in Domesday Book of 1086 as Covenham and in 13th century copies of earlier charters as Coveham. It is recorded as Cobbeham and Cobeham in the 15th century and the first use of the modern spelling "Cobham" is from 1570. The name is thought to derive from an Anglo-Saxon landowner either as Cofa's hām or Cofa's hamm. The second part of the name may have originated from the Old English hām meaning a settlement or enclosure, or from hamm meaning land close to water.

The area of the village known as Cobham Tilt, is first recorded as la Tilthe in 1328. The name is thought to derive from the Old English Tilthe, meaning "cultivated land".

== History ==
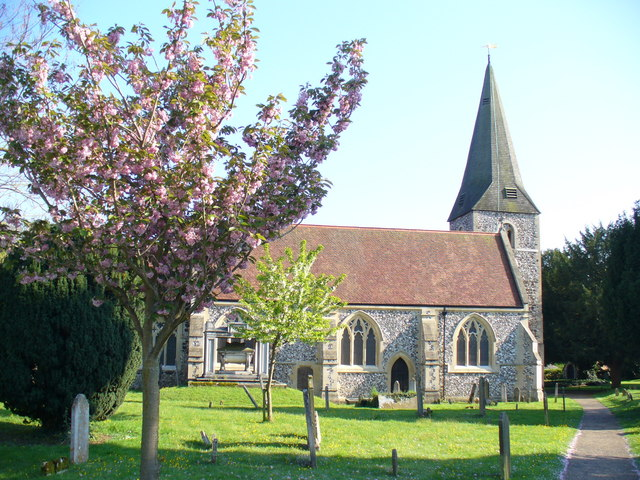
St Andrew's Church

Cobham is an ancient settlement whose origins can be traced back on the ground through Roman times to the Iron Age. It lay within the Elmbridge hundred.

Cobham appears in Domesday Book as Covenham and was held by Chertsey Abbey. Its Domesday assets were: 12½ hides; 3 mills worth 13s 4d, 10 ploughs, 1 alike unit of meadow, woodland worth 40 hogs. It rendered altogether £14 per year to its feudal system overlords.

Historically, Cobham other than outlying farms comprised two developed areas, Street Cobham and Church Cobham. The former lay on the Portsmouth-London Road, and the building now known as the Cobham Exchange was once a coaching inn. The latter grew up around St Andrew's Church, which dates from the 12th century. Although much altered and extended in the 19th century, the church preserves a Norman tower and is a Grade I listed building (the highest architectural category).

In 1649, the Diggers established a new community at Little Heath following their expulsion from nearby St George's Hill, Weybridge. The community met some success, with 11 acres (4.5 ha) cultivated, six houses built, winter crops harvested, and several pamphlets published. The local lord, of the manor, Parson John Platt, despite initial sympathy, rallied gangs to attack the community and prevent locals in assisting them. Platt and local landowners drove the community out in April 1650.

The village's population was reported as 1617 inhabitants in 1848. The arrival of the railway in the 1880s led to the expansion of the original village, the eastern fields and southern areas towards the railway station becoming suburbanised during the 20th century. A 1960s improvements scheme widened the entrance to the High Street from River Hill to the south which was very narrow, removing a few historic and picturesque buildings, replacing some with less ornate brickwork glass-fronted buildings suitable as shops. Subsequently, the High Street has developed into a local shopping centre.

In 1951 the civil parish had a population of 7885. On 1 April 1974 the parish was abolished.

=== Aviation and motor industries ===
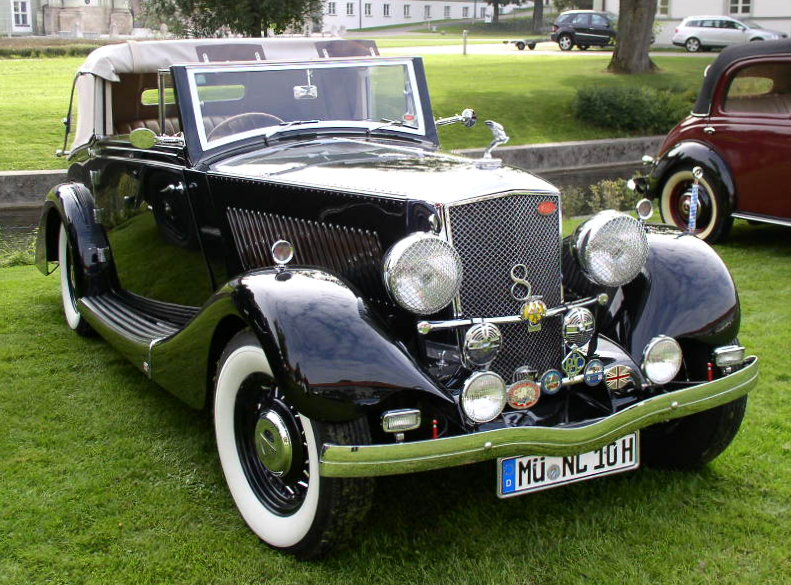
A 1936 Railton Straight Eight. Altogether 1379 of the Railton 8s were made.

Cobham is 2.5 miles (4.0 km) from Brooklands and played host to associated and its own aviation and motoring activity in the 20th century. Leading motor engineer and car designers Reid Railton and Noel Macklin set up a manufacturing facility, building Railton road cars at the Fairmile Works from 1933 to 1940. An example is displayed at Brooklands Museum in the same borough.

In World War II, after a major aircraft factory, Vickers-Armstrongs, at Brooklands was bombed by the Luftwaffe on 4 September 1940, with heavy loss of life and many more injured, the Vickers Experimental Department was quickly dispersed to secret premises on the Silvermere and Foxwarren Park estates along Redhill Road. Engineer and inventor Barnes Wallis also carried out important trials catapulting models of his 'Upkeep' bouncing bomb across Silvermere Lake around 1942 and conducted spinning trials with larger prototypes at 'Depot W46' (the largest of the three dispersed sites). Vickers had numerous other wartime dispersed depots locally and those within the boundaries or whose nearest village was Cobham included Corbie Wood and Riseholme (on Seven Hills Road), Conway Cottage and Norwood Farm.

Despite its proximity to Brooklands and Wisley airfields (both active until the early 1970s), Cobham saw relatively few aircraft crashes. Most notable was a Lockheed P-38 Lightning fighter which flew low over Brooklands apparently in trouble and crashed at Cobham on 16 March 1944; the pilot survived and little else was published of this incident.

During World War II aircraft company Airspeed Ltd set up a design office at Fairmile Manor which designed the civil aircraft the Airspeed Ambassador before moving back to Portsmouth in the late 1940s.

After the war, Vickers' Experimental Department continued to use two of the Redhill Road sites (now known as 'Foxwarren') and built aircraft prototypes there such as the Viscount airliner and Valiant V-bomber, until it moved back to the main factory at Brooklands in the late 1950s.

In the 1970s residents Mike Chambers ran a business building Huron Formula Fords and a Formula Atlantic car at the Silvermere works and Geoff Uren prepared the BMW team saloon cars and Graham Hill's Jägermeister-sponsored Formula 2 car.

From 1972 to 2011 Cobham Bus Museum occupied an ex-aircraft hangar (used mainly by Vickers-Armstrongs as a machine shop) next to Silvermere golf course in Redhill Road. The bus museum reopened as the London bus museum at Brooklands Museum on 1 August 2011. The former premises have been replaced by a care home.

== Geography ==
=== Boundaries ===
Cobham fits into a triangle between the River Mole to the south, the A3 to the north and a borderline for the most part on the nearside of the (New) London to Guildford railway line to the southeast – directly west of Oxshott. On the southern border is the historic village, Stoke D'Abernon, part of the small post town, which gives its name to the railway station between the two areas on the line mentioned: Cobham & Stoke D'Abernon.

=== Other ===
Soil

The village neighbourhoods of Downside (south) and Fairmile (east). The longstanding built-up areas resemble the adjacent fertile east banks of the Mole such as at landscape garden Painshill Park on free-draining gravel topped with layers of alluvium. This contrasts with the steep west bank, acidic sandy heath, which underlies the highest land on all the outskirts, residual outcrops of the Bagshot Sands (Formation). These isolate Cobham village historically, Esher Commons, Oxshott Heath and Woods and the Redhill Common part of Ockham and Wisley Commons.

Elevation

Watershed points, or in international terms drainage divides, are at the summits of the sides of the lower Mole Valley, attaining 60 metres (200 ft) and 65 metres (213 ft) towards the east close to Oxshott and Stoke D'Abernon respectively.

The River Mole runs through Cobham, with a visitor area and well-surfaced path by the mill in the High Street, dividing the remaining agricultural parts of Cobham in the west and south. Elevation reaches a minimum here of 20 metres (66 ft) above sea level.

Demography

Cobham used to have two wards; the Cobham Fairmile ward has a population of 4,760 neighbouring Cobham and Downside has a population of 6,158. Cobham Fairmile ward has been abolished and is now part of the Oxshott and Stoke d'Abernon Ward.

== Landmarks ==
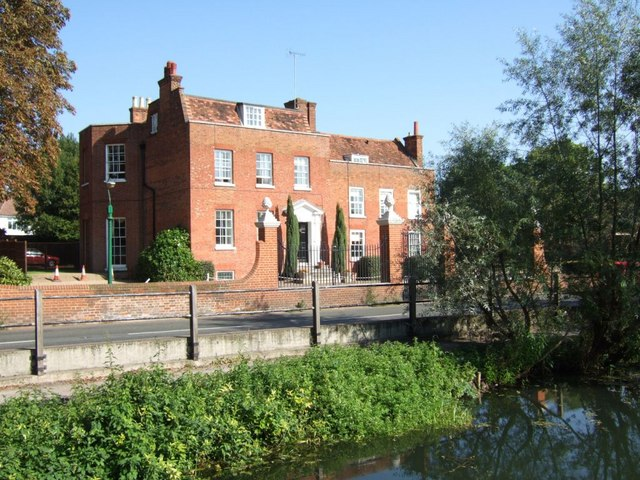
Cedar House

At the heart of Cobham is the Church Cobham Conservation Area, which was designated in 1973 and includes fourteen statutory listed buildings. Amongst these are Pyports, once the home of Vernon Lushington; the picturesque Church Stile House; and two fine houses overlooking the River Mole: Ham Manor and Cedar House, the latter owned by the National Trust.

The Cobham Park estate was the home of John Ligonier, 1st Earl Ligonier, once Head of the Armed Forces. In 1806, the estate was bought by Harvey Christian Combe, a brewer and Lord Mayor of London. The present house was completed in 1873 by his nephew, Charles Combe, to a design by Edward Middleton Barry: It has now been divided into apartments. Painshill Park is a fine 18th-century landscape garden, restored from dereliction since 1980. Painshill House dates from the 18th century and has also been divided into apartments.

Two other large houses on the outskirts of Cobham have been taken over by schools: Heywood is now the American Community School, and Burwood House is now Notre Dame School.

The Chelsea F.C. training ground is also nearby.

=== Cobham Mill ===
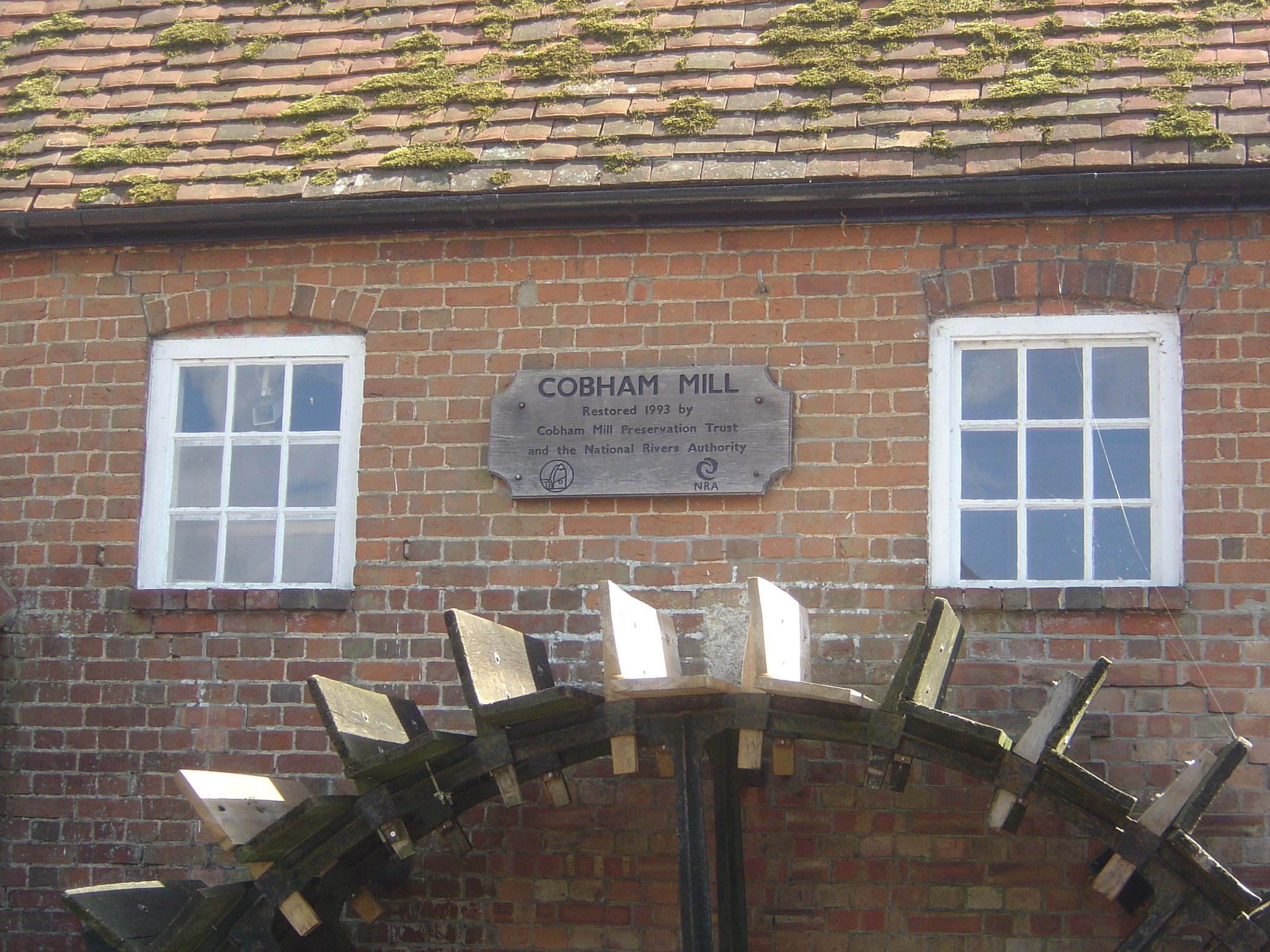
Cobham Mill

The River Mole provides a setting for the red brick water mill, constructed in the late 18th century and once part of a much larger complex. It stands on the site of earlier mills dating back to the Middle Ages. The mill was in use until 1928, when it became uneconomical to continue operating. Thereafter it was used as a storehouse.

During World War II, a Canadian tank collided with the main building, causing much damage.

In 1953 the main part of the mill was demolished by Surrey County Council to alleviate traffic congestion on Mill Road. This left just the grist mill standing.

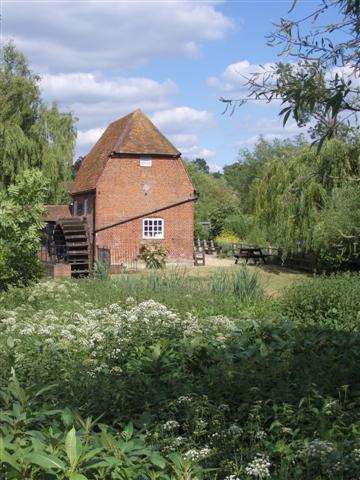
Cobham Mill, June 2005

In 1973 the Cobham Conservation Group was formed, later to become the Cobham Conservation and Heritage Trust, and one of its main objectives was to rescue the much deteriorated grist mill building from sliding into the river as a result of water erosion of the mill island. In 1986 the freehold of the mill was taken over by the Thames Water Authority who, as part of their flood control expenditure rebuilt the weirs nearby and shored up the mill's foundations.

Thereafter, the Cobham Mill Preservation Trust was formed as a sister organisation to the Cobham Conservation Group and took over the leasehold. The building was restored to full working order by the volunteers of the Cobham Mill Preservation Trust, and first opened to the public in 1993. Cobham Mill is now open to the public from 2 pm to 5 pm on the second Sunday of each month between April and October, inclusive.

== Education ==
St Andrew's Primary School is located in the village as is Cobham Free School which is an all-through school. A local prep school is Feltonfleet School. There are three independent schools: Notre Dame; ACS (The American Community Schools) Cobham International and Reed's School.

== Local leisure and entertainment ==
Painshill Park is nearby and Silvermere golf course is located in Redhill Road on the north side of the A3. Cobham has four football clubs: Cobham F.C., Mole Valley SCR F.C., Cobham United Football Club and Cobham Town FC (formed 2007). Cobham also has a cricket club, Cobham Avorians, formed in 1928. Avorians was named after its founder, local landowner Edward James Avory, and originally played at the Fairmile Estate before re-locating to Convent Lane on the Burwood Estate in 1948. Cobham Rugby Football Club has four teams which play regularly, as well as youth and mini sections. There is Cobham Village Club and a branch of the Royal British Legion. Cobham Players regularly present plays, musicals, pantomimes and other entertainments in Cobham.

Walton Firs Activity Centre lies just off the A3 in Cobham and covers 28 acres. It takes its name from Colonel Walton, who dealt with the purchase of the site in 1939. It was used by a Royal Artillery anti-aircraft battery during World War II and in peacetime returned to use as a Scout camp site. During the 1990s some 3,000 additional trees were planted, and more recently an all-weather barn and an artificial, but realistic, caving complex have been added.

== Politics ==
=== Parliament and local ===
Cobham is in the Runnymede and Weybridge constituency. The member of parliament (MP) is Conservative Ben Spencer, elected in 2019 and re-elected in 2024.

In local government Cobham is part of Elmbridge Borough Council and Surrey County Council. Until 2016, Cobham was divided into two wards, Cobham Fairmile and Cobham & Downside for Elmbridge voting. Following boundary changes in 2016, Cobham was divided between a newly drawn Cobham and downside ward and an expanded Oxshott & Stoke d'Abernon ward, with the Fairmile name disappearing. There are six councillors covering the two new wards, 4 Conservative and 2 Liberal Democrat as from May 2023. Cobham councillor James Browne was Leader of Elmbridge Borough Council in 2019. For Surrey County voting, Cobham is paired with Stoke d'Abernon.

Following local government reorganisation in Surrey, the Borough of Elmbridge is scheduled to be dissolved on 31 March 2027. On 1 April 2027, Cobham will officially become part of the newly established single-tier unitary authority, East Surrey Council.

Cobham contains numerous historic buildings, designated conservation areas, and ongoing housing development pressures. Local civic affairs are heavily supported by the Cobham Conservation and Heritage Trust, which re-formed in 2007 to preserve local environment and history, alongside the Cobham and Downside Residents' Association (CDRA). Historically, the local municipal boundaries were dominated by the Conservative Party, with the Fairmile ward electing Liberal councillor Mike King in 1984 as a rare historical exception. While the Liberal Democrats managed to gain ground in the Cobham and Downside municipal ward during early 2020s local cycles, the political landscape shifted during the transition to a single-tier unitary framework. Following the creation of the shadow authority for the incoming East Surrey Council in May 2026, the newly consolidated Cobham & Oxshott South ward elected Conservatives David John Lewis and Alan Charles Parker to represent the area ahead of the formal abolition of Elmbridge Borough Council on 31 March 2027.

At the county level, the Cobham division of Surrey County Council is represented by Conservative councillor David Lewis, who serves as the Cabinet Member for Finance and Resources. Following the structural collapse of the two-tier system under the Surrey (Structural Changes) Order 2026, the historical division profiles will be permanently retired. Effective from the 1 April 2027 vesting day, Cobham's regional representation is consolidated into the unified multi-member Cobham & Oxshott South ward under the jurisdiction of the single-tier unitary East Surrey Council.

=== British Army ===
Following the formation of the Territorial Force in 1908, the village for recruiting, was granted to the 6th Battalion, The East Surrey Regiment which maintained a platoon from A Company. The village also maintained the "Sandyroyd School Troops of Scouts".

== Road and rail links ==
To the north and west of the village is the A3 trunk road, a major arterial route from London to Portsmouth. This road links to the M25 motorway at Junction 10, immediately to the southwest of Cobham.

- The A307, Portsmouth Road starts in Cobham and runs northwards to the adjoining town of Esher. This is also known as the "old A3".
- The A245 runs through the centre of the town and leads to Leatherhead in the south-east and Byfleet to the west.

Cobham & Stoke d'Abernon railway station, opened in 1885, is on the New Guildford line from London Waterloo.

== Police and fire services ==
The closest public desk and offices of Surrey Police is at the Civic Offices, Elmbridge Borough Council, in Esher.

Surrey Fire & Rescue Service, called Painshill Fire Station, has a full-time day crew together with:

- 1 water tender ladder
- 1 incident command unit
- 1 HIAB Unimog
- 1 Multi-role vehicle (MRV)

== Notable people ==
- John Addison, (1920–1998), composer, was born in Cobham.
- Julia Armfield (born 1990), writer, grew up in Cobham
- Matthew Arnold, (1822–1888), poet, lived in Cobham from 1873 to 1888.
- Malcolm Arbuthnot, (1877–1967), pictorialist, photographer and artist, was born in Cobham.
- Sir Felix Aylmer, (1889–1979), actor, lived at Painshill House, Cobham in the 1970s.
- Antonio Banderas (born 1960), Spanish actor, lives in Cobham
- Sue Biggs, director general of the Royal Horticultural Society.
- General Sir Thomas Brotherton, (1785–1868), died nearby and is buried in St. Andrew's churchyard.
- Louis Cole, (born 1983), British film-maker and YouTube personality.
- Harvey Christian Combe, (1752–1818), brewer, Lord Mayor of London, owner of Cobham Park
- Aaron Eckhart, (born 1968), American actor, lived in Cobham and attended the American Community School.
- Shane Filan, (born 1979), singer, former member of Westlife, has homes in Cobham and Sligo, Ireland.
- Kit Hain, (born 1956), singer and songwriter, was born in Cobham
- Harold B. Hudson, (1898–1982), World War I flying ace, was born in Cobham.
- Nick Jones, (born 1963), entrepreneur, owner of Babington House and husband of Kirsty Young, grew up in Cobham.
- Nicholas Lane, (c.1585–1644), cartographer, came from a Cobham family and his earliest surviving work, 1613, is of Painshill.
- John Ligonier, 1st Earl Ligonier, (1680–1770), Commander-in-Chief of the British Army, lived at Cobham Park.
- John Lodge, (1943–2025), singer and songwriter, former member of The Moody Blues, had homes in Cobham and Naples, Florida, USA.
- Vernon Lushington, (1832–1912), lawyer and patron to the arts, lived at Pyports in Cobham.
- Sir (Albert) Noel Campbell Macklin (1886–1946), of Fairmile estate, a British car maker and boat designer.
- Kenneth McAlpine (1920–2023), racing driver, was born in Cobham.
- Nichola McAuliffe (born 1955), television and stage actress and writer, was born in Cobham.
- Admiral Sir Graham Moore, (1764–1843), naval officer, lived at Brook Farm in Cobham and is buried in St. Andrew's churchyard.
- General Lord Henry Percy VC KCB, (1817–1877), soldier and MP, was born at Burwood House (now Notre Dame School).
- Sir Thomas Sopwith, (1888–1989), aviation pioneer and industrialist who founded the Sopwith Aviation, H G Hawker Engineering, Hawker Aircraft and Hawker Siddeley aircraft companies, lived at Compton House, Cobham in the 1920s.
- Fred Stedman, (1870–1918), Surrey county cricketer, was born in Cobham.
- Gerrard Winstanley, (1609–1676), reformer, lived in Cobham from 1643 and was churchwarden in 1667–1668.
- Mudar Zahran, (born 1973), Jordanian politician and Secretary General of the Jordanian Opposition Coalition.

== Demography and housing ==
2011 census homes
Output area	Detached	Semi-detached	Terraced	Flats and apartments	Caravans/temporary/mobile homes	Shared between households
Cobham Fairmile (ward)	792	366	274	262	1	2
Centre and south (Note: Cobham and Downside (ward) less Elmbridge 017C)	1,157	687	401	507	4	2

The average level of accommodation in the region composed of detached houses was 28%, the average that was apartments was 22.6%.

Output area	Population	Households	% Owned outright	% Owned with a loan	hectares
Cobham Fairmile (ward)	4,751	1,697	34	32	553
Centre and south	4,988	2,047	40	31	276

The proportion of households in the settlement who owned their home outright compares to the regional average of 35.1%. The proportion who owned their home with a loan compares to the regional average of 32.5%. The remaining % is made up of rented dwellings (plus a negligible % of households living rent-free).

== In film, fiction and the media ==
The Cobham News & Mail covered local news in the latter part of the 20th century until it closed and was incorporated into the Surrey Advertiser. Cobham is also covered by the Elmbridge Guardian, the Surrey Herald and the Surrey Comet newspapers.

== Nearest places ==
- Stoke D'Abernon
- Oxshott
- Esher
- Leatherhead
- Hersham
- Weybridge
- Walton-on-Thames
- Effingham
- Byfleet
- East Horsley
- West Horsley
- Downside

== Bibliography ==
- Boot, Roy (1990). From Spitfire to Eurofighter: 45 years of combat aircraft design. Shrewsbury: AirLife Publishing. ISBN 978-1-85-310093-2.
- Gover, J.E.B.; Mawer, A.; Stenton, F.M. (1969). The place-names of Surrey. Cambridge: Cambridge University Press.
- Mills, A.D. (2003). Oxford Dictionary of British Place Names. Oxford: Oxford University Press. ISBN 978-0-19-852758-9.
- Sedgwick, Michael; Gillies, Mark (1989). A-Z of Cars of the 1930s. Devon: Bay View Books. ISBN 978-1-87-097938-2.
- Taylor, David C. (2003). Cobham: A history. Chichester: Philimore. ISBN 978-1-86-077247-4.
- Westlake, Ray (2011). The Territorials : 1908–1914: A guide for military and family historians. Barnsley: Pen and Sword. ISBN 978-1-84-884360-8. OCLC 780443267.
