= Occam process =

Method for use in the manufacturing of electronic circuit boards

The Occam process is a solder-free, Restriction of Hazardous Substances Directive (RoHS)-compliant method for use in circuit board manufacturing developed by Verdant Electronics. It combines the usual two steps of constructing printed circuit boards (PCBs) followed by the population process of placing various leaded and non-leaded electronic components into one process. The name "Occam" comes from a quotation by William of Ockham.

== Overview ==
Electronic components are first positioned onto an adhesive layer of a temporary or permanent substrate, according to the design parameters. Then, the pre-tested, burned-in components are held firm in their positions by encapsulating them in insulating material, and the entire assembly is then inverted. The adhesive layer is then cut (after removing the temporary substrate if it exists) or drilled out over the component leads, mechanically or by laser ablation. These holes are then plated with a conductive, copper connection (a via) from the top of the layer to the component leads. If needed, other components or vias encapsulation layers can be placed on top of each other to make multi-level circuit connections. This construction is then coated with copper where needed to provide traces. Thus, this finished circuit board can now receive a conformal coating to protect against the environment and then be placed into an assembly housing or sent through another process for mechanical and/or electrical connections with other PCBs.

== Advantages ==
In 2006, European RoHS regulations prompted the research to move from traditional lead-based solder connection processes to a more environmentally friendly approach. Much manufacturing is currently being done with tin-based solder to address this issue. Using tin requires much higher reflow temperatures and can result in rework stages due to electric shorts caused by tin-whiskers (electrically conductive structures formed in this process) and other issues in the manufacturing process, which are avoided by the Occam process.

PCBs themselves are usually created using a phenolic resin, itself a corrosive, toxic substance completely removed from the Occam process. Also, the nitric acid or ferric chloride used to etch traces into the boards is also removed from the process.

Since the PCB and parts population stages happen in the same process in the same plant, a company would no longer need to wait for the delivery of ordered PCBs to begin manufacturing.

The high temperatures usually seen by PCBs inside of a reflow soldering oven are avoided by use of this process. This means that any issue of moisture sensitivity (MSL) in components by outgassing of moisture is completely avoided. This also then removes the storage equipment and processes needed to keep the moisture levels low in more intricate and expensive chips.

== Disadvantages ==
Currently, though the process is set, it has not yet been implemented. It is defined as a “disruptive technology” requiring a complete change in current manufacturing processes. Therefore, cost concerns for manufacturers needing new equipment, labour concerns for current PCB manufacturers and others will need to be solved or addressed before the widespread adoption of this process.

Although many toxic chemicals are removed from the traditional process, Occam's increased use of encapsulation by epoxy could mean more of that sort of waste. The usual additives in epoxy have been shown to mimic estrogen, possibly resulting in adverse hormonal responses in humans.

== See also ==
- Chip on board
