= Peter King, 1st Baron King =

English lawyer and politician

The Right Honourable The Lord King PC FRS
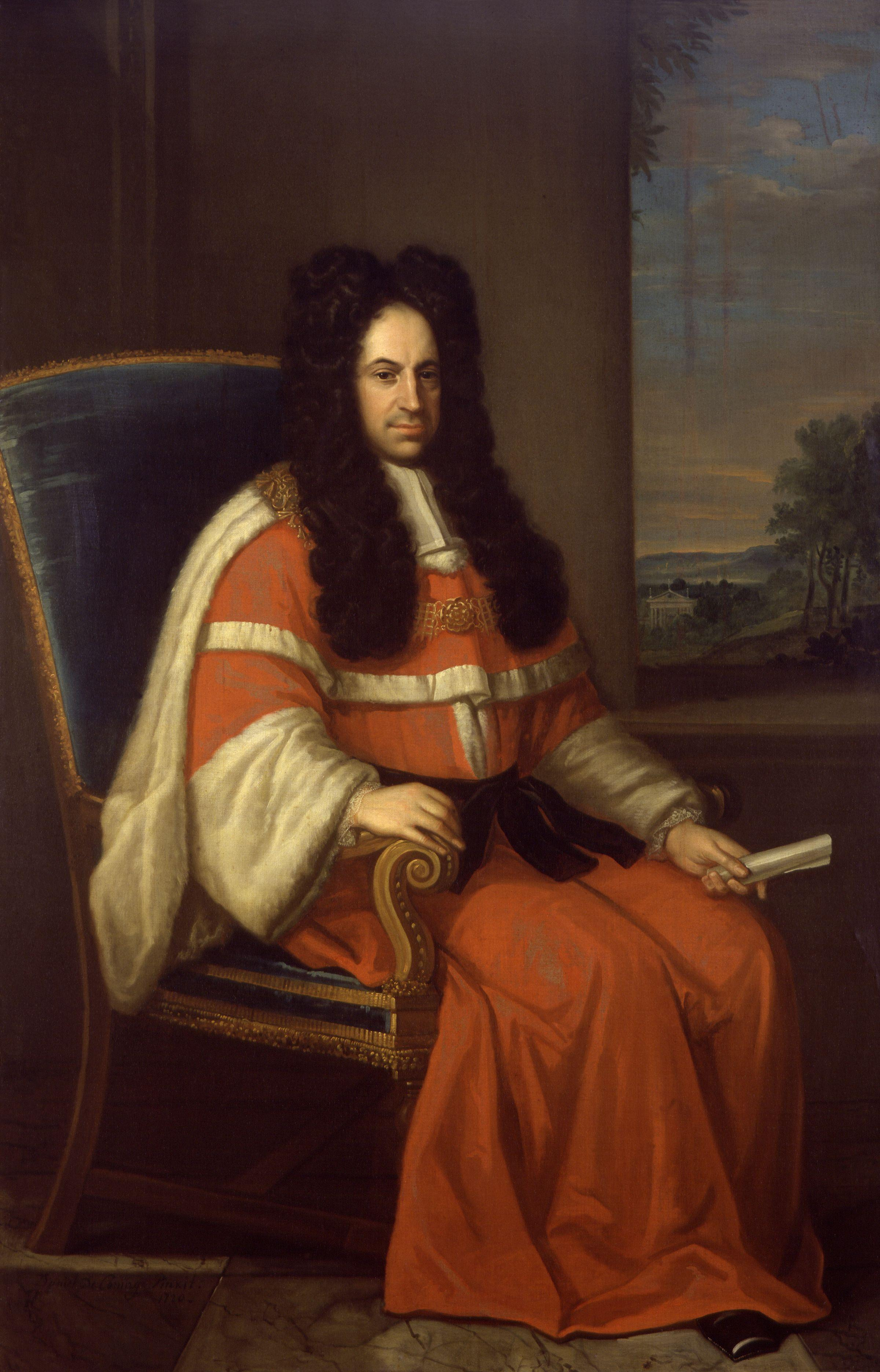
- The 1st Lord King, by Daniel de Coning, 1720

Lord Chancellor Lord High Steward for the trial of: List: The Earl of Macclesfield
- In office 1 June 1725 – 29 November 1733
- Monarchs: George I; George II
- Prime Minister: Sir Robert Walpole
- Preceded by: In Commission
- Succeeded by: The Lord Talbot

Chief Justice of the Common Pleas
- In office 1714–1725
- Preceded by: The Lord Trevor
- Succeeded by: Sir Robert Eyre

Personal details
- Born: 1669 Exeter
- Died: 22 July 1734 Surrey
- Spouse: Anne Seys
- Children: 6
- Education: Leiden University

Peter King, 1st Baron King, PC, FRS (c. 1669 – 22 July 1734), commonly referred to as Lord King, was an English lawyer and politician, who became Lord High Chancellor of Great Britain.

A distant relative of the philosopher John Locke, King entered Parliament in 1700 as member of Parliament for Bere Alston and became associated with the Whig interest. As Lord Chancellor, King supported the Hanoverian succession and the established Church of England. King remained in office until 1733, a year before his death.

== Life ==
King was born in Exeter in 1669, and educated at Exeter Grammar School. In his youth he was interested in early church history, and published anonymously in 1691 An Enquiry into the Constitution, Discipline, Unity and Worship of the Primitive Church that flourished within the first Three Hundred Years after Christ. This treatise engaged the interest of his cousin, John Locke, the philosopher, by whose advice his father sent him to the Leiden University, where he stayed for nearly three years. He entered the Middle Temple in 1694 and was called to the bar in 1698.

In 1700 he was returned to Parliament of England as the member for Bere Alston in Devon, holding the seat until 1715.

He was appointed recorder of Glastonbury in 1705 and recorder of London in 1708. Made a Serjeant-at-Law, he was appointed Chief Justice of the Common Pleas from 1714 to 1725, when he was raised to the peerage as a Lord Justice and Speaker of the House of Lords. In June of the same year he was made Lord High Chancellor of Great Britain, holding office until compelled by a paralytic stroke to resign in 1733.

He was admitted a Fellow of the Royal Society on 14 November 1728.

He died at Ockham, Surrey, on 22 July 1734 and was buried in All Saints' Church. In 1735, the King Chapel was added to the church, separated from the main aisle by a round headed, and there is a vaulted plaster ceiling springing from angle pilasters. Intended as a chapel over the family vault of the Lords King of Ockham and their descendants, the Earls of Lovelace, it features several church monuments, including the monument to Peter King, 1st Baron King, and his wife Anne Seys, which was sculpted by Michael Rysbrack. It is on the north wall, white marble in Palladian style, with two figures sitting either side of large urn in front of pyramidal ground. Symbols of office surround Lord King.

== Family ==
King married Anne Seys in 1704. They had six children: two daughters and four sons. Each of their sons succeeded in turn as Lord King, Baron of Ockham.

After his death in 1734, the widowed Lady King lived in Grosvenor Square until her death in 1767.

In 1835 his great-great-grandson William King (1805–1893), married Ada Byron, the only daughter of Lord Byron and was later created Earl of Lovelace. Another descendant Peter John Locke King was a Member of Parliament for Surrey from 1847 to 1849 and won some fame as an advocate of reform, being responsible for the passing of the Real Estate Charges Act 1854, and for the repeal of a large number of obsolete laws.

== Assessment as Lord Chancellor ==
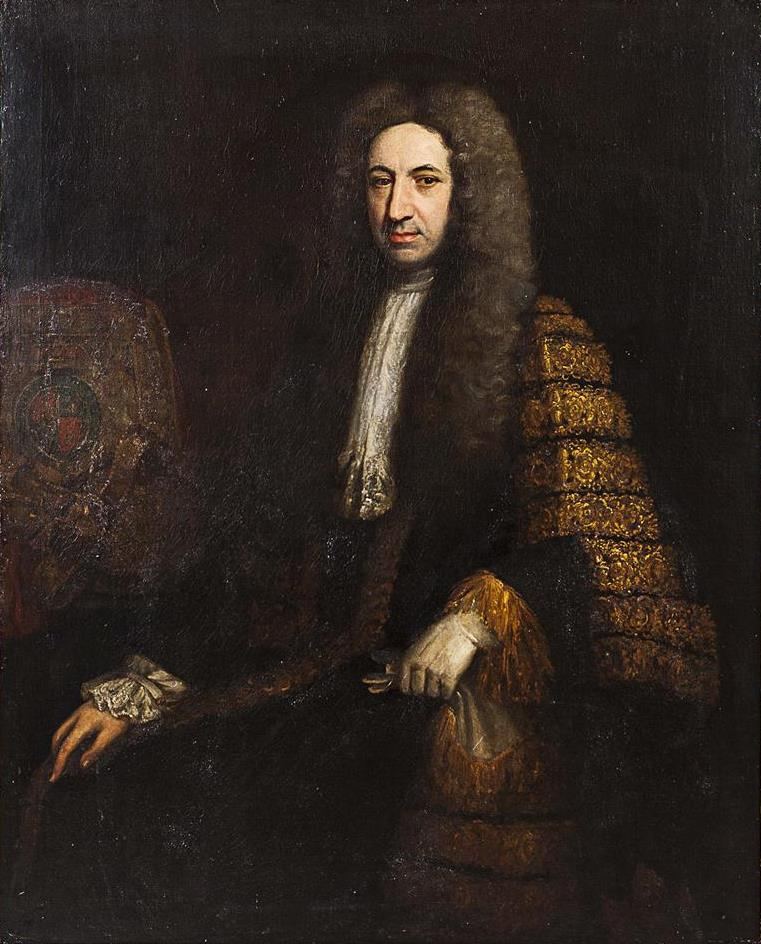
Lord King, Lord Chancellor

Lord King as chancellor failed to sustain the reputation which he had acquired at the common law bar. Nevertheless, he left his mark on English law by establishing the principles that a will of immovable property is governed by the lex loci rei sitae, and that where a husband had a legal right to the personal estate of his wife, which must be asserted by a suit in equity, the court would not help him unless he made a provision out of the property for the wife, if she required it. He was also the author of the Act (Proceedings in Courts of Justice Act 1730) by virtue of which English superseded Latin as the language of the courts.

== Works ==
Lord King published in 1702 a History of the Apostles' Creed (Leipzig, 1706; Basel, 1750) which went through several editions and was also translated into Latin. His earlier work An Enquiry into the Constitution, Discipline, Unity and Worship of the Primitive Church that flourished within the first Three Hundred Years after Christ was published 1691; quoted by Methodist leader John Wesley in many of his correspondences, it is seen as influencing many of his view on the order of the Church.

== Cases ==
Some notable cases on which he was involved:

- R v Woodburne and Coke
- Keech v Sandford (1726) Sel Cas Ch 61
- Coppin v Coppin (1725) – a will settling land in England must conform to the rules of English law, even when made abroad
- Croft v Pyke (1733) – a partner's joint estate is liable first to the debts of the partnership, before payment of legacies to heirs
- Milner v Colmer (1731)
- Brown et Uxor v Elton (1733) – the practice of the court was to compel a husband to make a settlement on the wife before recovering his wife's portion by equity

Spoke in support of the second article brought against Henry Sacheverell, February 28, 1709/10 – 'Tryal of Dr.Sacheverell' printed London 1710

Parliament of England
Preceded by John Hawles; James Montagu	Member of Parliament for Bere Alston; 1701–1707; With: Sir Rowland Gwynne 1701; William Cowper 1701–1705; Spencer Cowper 1705–1707	Succeeded by Parliament of Great Britain
Parliament of Great Britain
Preceded by Parliament of England	Member of Parliament for Bere Alston; 1707–1715; With: Spencer Cowper 1707–1710; Lawrence Carter 1710–1715	Succeeded by Lawrence Carter; Horatio Walpole
Legal offices
Preceded by The Lord Trevor	Chief Justice of the Common Pleas; 1714–1725	Succeeded by Sir Robert Eyre
Political offices
Preceded by In Commission	Lord High Chancellor of Great Britain; 1725–1733	Succeeded by The Lord Talbot
Peerage of Great Britain
New creation	Baron King; 1725–1734	Succeeded by John King
