= Ockham and Wisley Commons =

Nature reserve in Surrey, England

Coordinates: 51.318°N 0.456°W

- Site of Special Scientific Interest
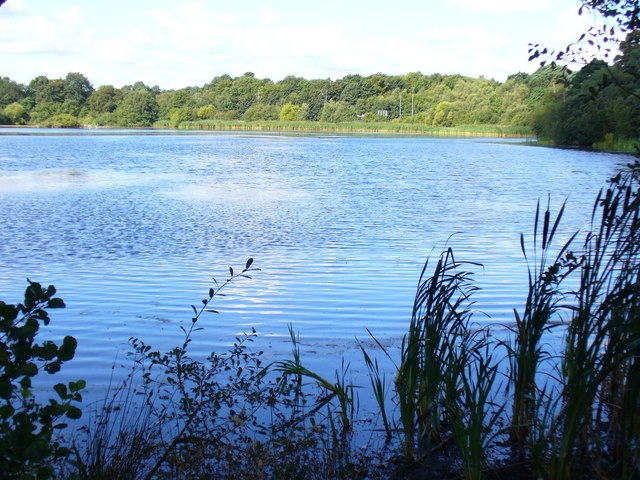
- Location of Ockham and Wisley Commons.
- Area of search: Surrey
- Grid reference: TQ 077 588
- Interest: Biological
- Area: 266.0 hectares (657 acres)
- Notification date: 1986
- Location map: Magic Map

Ockham and Wisley Commons is a 266-hectare (660-acre) biological Site of Special Scientific Interest east of Woking in Surrey. It is also a Local Nature Reserve and part of the Thames Basin Heaths Special Protection Area. It is part of the slightly larger area of 297-hectare (730-acre) Wisley & Ockham Commons & Chatley Heath nature reserve, which is owned by Surrey County Council and managed by the Surrey Wildlife Trust. The two commons are separated by the A3 road, and in 2026 the Cockrow heathland green bridge was opened connecting the sites.

This site is mainly heathland but it also has areas of open water, bog, woodland and scrub. It has a rich flora and it is of national importance for true flies and for dragonflies and damselflies. Rare species include the white-faced darter dragonfly and the Thyridanthrax fenestratus bee fly.

There is public access to the site.
