= Chinnery =

Chinnery is a surname. Notable people with the surname include:

- Broderick Chinnery (1742–1808), Irish politician and baronet
- Dennis Chinnery (1927–2012), British actor
- Derek Chinnery (1925–2015), controller of BBC Radio 1
- Doug Chinnery (born 1964), English landscape photographer
- Ernest Chinnery (1887–1972), Australian anthropologist
- Esmé Chinnery (1886–1915), English soldier and aviator
- George Chinnery (1774–1852), English painter
- George Chinnery (bishop) (d.1780), Anglican bishop in Ireland
- Harry Chinnery (1876–1916), English cricketer
- Patrick Chinnery (born 1968), professor of neurogenetics at the University of Cambridge
- Sarah Chinnery (1887–1970), British-Australian photographer
- Tony Chinnery, builder of historical keyboard instruments
