= William Keane =

William Keane may refer to:

- William Keane (author), 19th-century English garden writer
- William Keane (bishop) RC bishop of Ross then Cloyne, Ireland
- William Keane (sailor) (1899–1949), American Olympic sailor
- Will Keane (born 1993), Irish football player
- Bill Keane (footballer) (1900–1978), Australian rules footballer
- Bil Keane (1922–2011), creator of The Family Circus comic
- Billy Keane (fl. 1980s), Irish hurler

== See also ==
- William Kean (1871–1954), British trade unionist
- William Keene (1915–1992), American television actor
- William B. Keene (1925–2018), American attorney, judge and television judge
- William Keen (disambiguation)
