= 2023–24 Australian bushfire season =

- Date: August 2023 – June 2024
- Location: Australia

Statistics
- Burned area: Approximately 960,819 square kilometres (370,974 sq mi)

Impacts
- Deaths: 10
- Structures destroyed: 170+: 171 Homes; TBC Outbuildings

Ignition
- Cause: Fire ignitions Enhanced fires: Positive Indian Ocean Dipole; El Nino phase; Substantial fuel loads; High temperatures

The 2023–24 Australian bushfire season (Note: Bushfires in Australia can occur all year-round. For what "season" means, see seasonality of bushfires in Australia.) was the summer season of bushfires in Australia. The spring and summer outlook for the season prediction was for increased risk of fire for regions in Queensland, New South Wales, Victoria, South Australia and the Northern Territory.

Above average temperatures and below average rainfall occurred for most of Australia. The fuel load growth was elevated due to above average rainfall associated with prolonged La Niña atmospheric conditions over the previous 3 years. A significantly dry and warm winter over much of Australia in 2023 elevated the fire risk associated with these fuel loads.

Other major contributing factors to the elevated fire risk included a strong El Niño in the tropical Pacific Ocean, an indicator for dry and hot weather patterns for eastern and southern Australia. Additionally, a sustained positive Indian Ocean Dipole lead to drier conditions in southern and central Australia. Global sea surface temperatures had continued to be the warmest on record since April 2023, while July 2023 had been the hottest month on record for global air temperatures. These trends continued with Australia's winter becoming the hottest on record. August, September and October continued this trend by being within the top 5 hottest and driest months on record, running approximately 3.38 °C above average and rainfall 70.8% below average in September.

Anthropogenic climate change influenced these conditions with Australia's climate warming approximately 1.47 °C from 1910 to 2021.

Other significant factors for an elevated fire season are over the past several years the number of days to conduct controlled burns have been lower compared to past years with NSW RFS reporting they have only been able to conduct around 20% of their Hazard Reduction targets. Leading to extensive fuel load build up, the previous 3 years of La Niña conditions enabled rapid vegetation growth throughout the landscape adding to the already high fuel loads. Areas which were impacted in the 2019–20 Australian bushfire season have fully regenerated, putting those communities back into potential risk.

Early into the season fire agencies reported that fire behaviour was similar or worse than the 2019–20 bushfire season, with the Queensland Fire and Emergency Services (QFES) Deputy Commissioner stating that it is the worst in 70 years.

By November 2023, over 61 million ha (150 million acres) had been burnt, more than during the entirety of the 2019–20 bushfire season.

== Overview ==
State / territory	Fatalities	Homes lost	Area (estimated)		Notes
State / territory	Fatalities	Homes lost	ha	acres	Notes
Australian Capital Territory	0	0	150	370	
New South Wales	4	25	1,000,000	2,471,053	
Northern Territory	0	0	84,000,000	207,568,520	
Queensland	5	70	911,778	2,253,052	
South Australia	0	0	450,000	1,111,974	
Tasmania	0	4	20,000	49,421	
Victoria	0	49	200,000	494,210	
Western Australia	1	25	9,500,000	23,475,011	
Total	10	171	96,081,928	237,423,611	

== Fires by state or territory ==
=== New South Wales ===
In August, over 70 blazes were already active in New South Wales leading to the New South Wales Rural Fire Service (NSW RFS) announcing an early start to the fire danger season across most of the state's north.

19 September an 'Extreme' fire danger warning was issued for the Far South Coast region of New South Wales, causing 29 schools to be closed. Strengthening winds resulted in the warning later being upgraded to "Catastrophic".

23 September six firefighters were injured when their fire truck crashed responding to a reported fire on the outskirts of Bathurst. Several firefighters had to be cut free from the wreckage and two were airlifted to Sydney in serious condition, with four being transported to local hospitals.

3 October a fire started burning in Coolagolite in the Bega Valley. Due to strong winds of up to 100 km/h (62 mph), the fire quickly spread leading to emergency warnings being issued in Bermagui and surrounding towns. By 5 October, the fire was largely brought under control after burning nearly 7,000 ha (17,300 acres) of bushland, destroying two homes, and fourteen outbuildings. Another fire broke out on 3 October in Kearsley, south-east of Cessnock in the Hunter Valley, burning over 190 ha (470 acres). Both of these fires required deployment of the newly bought NSW RFS Chinook and the 737 Large Air Tanker. Further resources from Queensland were lent to the NSW RFS to bring the fires under control. A further fire broke out on 3 October at Home Rule, between Mudgee and Gulgong in the state's Mid West. The fire led to widespread emergency warnings in the surrounding communities and burnt through hundreds of hectares, destroying one home and several outbuildings.

13 October firefighters saved ten houses from an out of control emergency level fire at Wallangara near Ashford which burnt over 2,000 hectares (5,000 acres).

14 October the NSW RFS confirmed the death of a volunteer firefighter in the Kyogle region, while fighting the Bean Creek fire which burnt over 1,100 hectares (2,273 acres).

16 October widespread extreme fire dangers were issued due to high temperatures and high winds upwards of 100 km/h (62 mph). Multiple fires broke out across the state, most noticeably in the state's Mid West and Mid North Coast where The Cope fire near Gulgong, the Upper Horseshoe Creek fire near Kyogle, the Bayshore Drive fire near Byron Bay, the Booral Road fire near Girvan, and the Rocky River Road fire near Tenterfield began. These fires quickly reached emergency warning levels, prompting widespread evacuations. Collectively these fires burnt over 2,905 hectares (7,178 acres). The Booral Road fire destroyed a home, while the Rocky River Road fire destroyed three.

On the same day the Willi Willi Road fire broke out of containment lines in Willi Willi National Park west of Kempsey, New South Wales, which then burnt over 30,000 hectares (74,131 acres). Fire crews reported that the fire exhibited "extraordinary" behavior similar to the 2019–20 Australian bushfire season. Numerous properties are believed to have been lost, with seven homes being confirmed destroyed and one person killed.

23 October a fast moving bush and grass fire broke out in a reserve on Hickeys Lane at Penrith. Numerous homes and businesses were evacuated and saved by firefighters from the blaze which grew to consume 30 hectares (74 acres).

25 October the Glens Creek Rd Fire near Nymboida, New South Wales developed a rare Cumulonimbus flammagenitus, Also known as a fire thunderstorm.

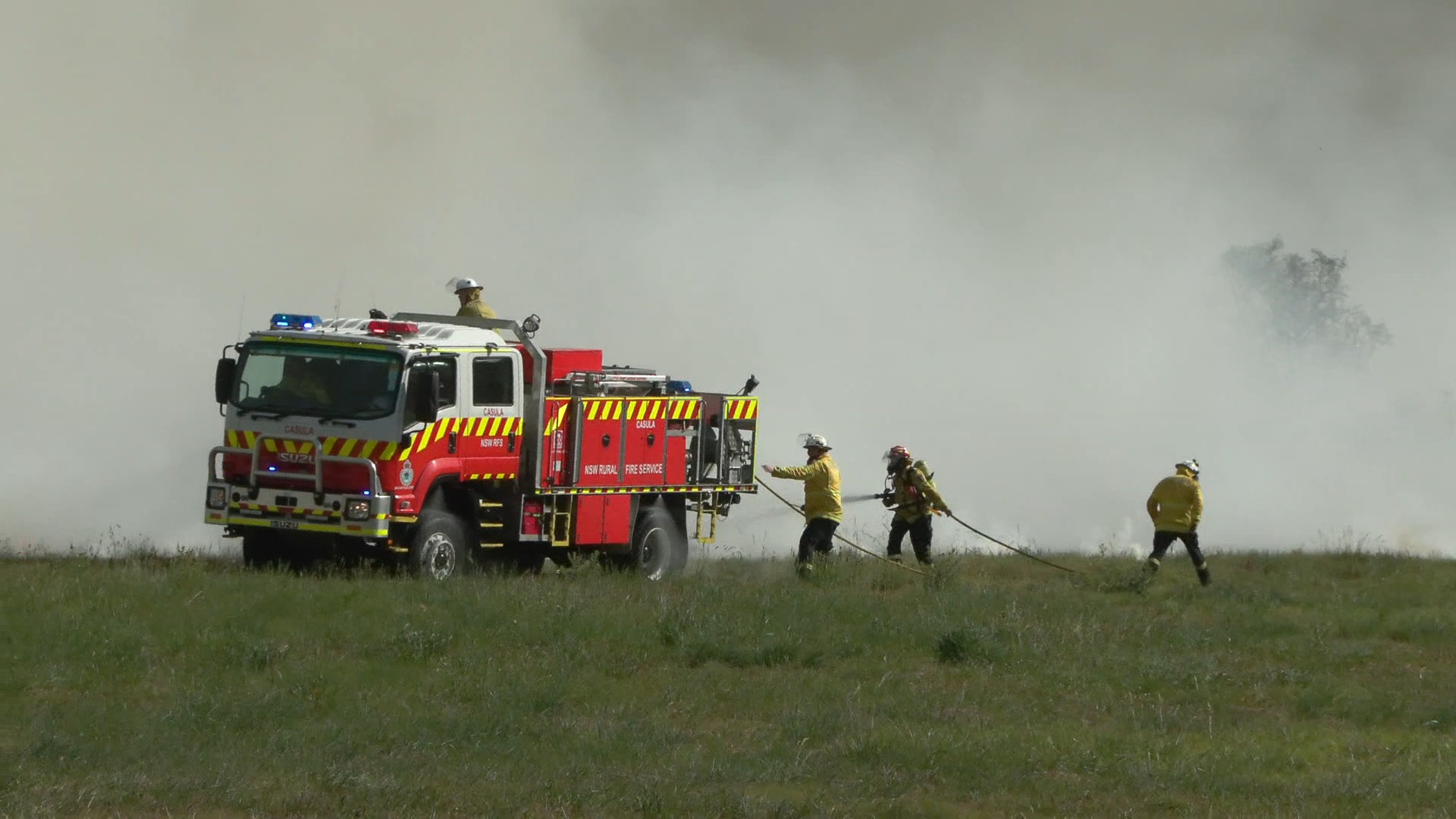
Firefighters battle grass fire, Ingleburn, NSW

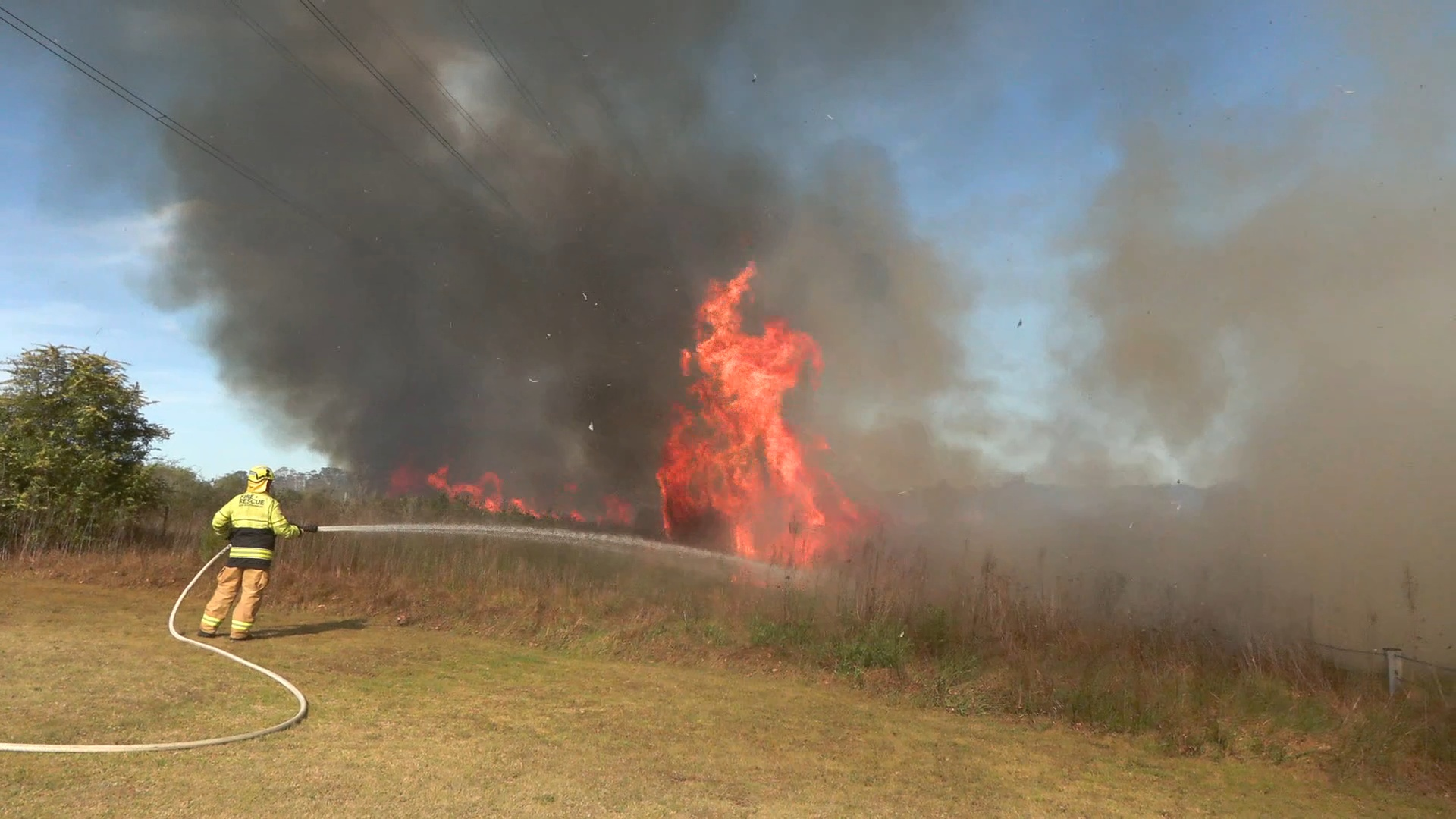
Firefighters battle grass fire, Ingleburn, NSW

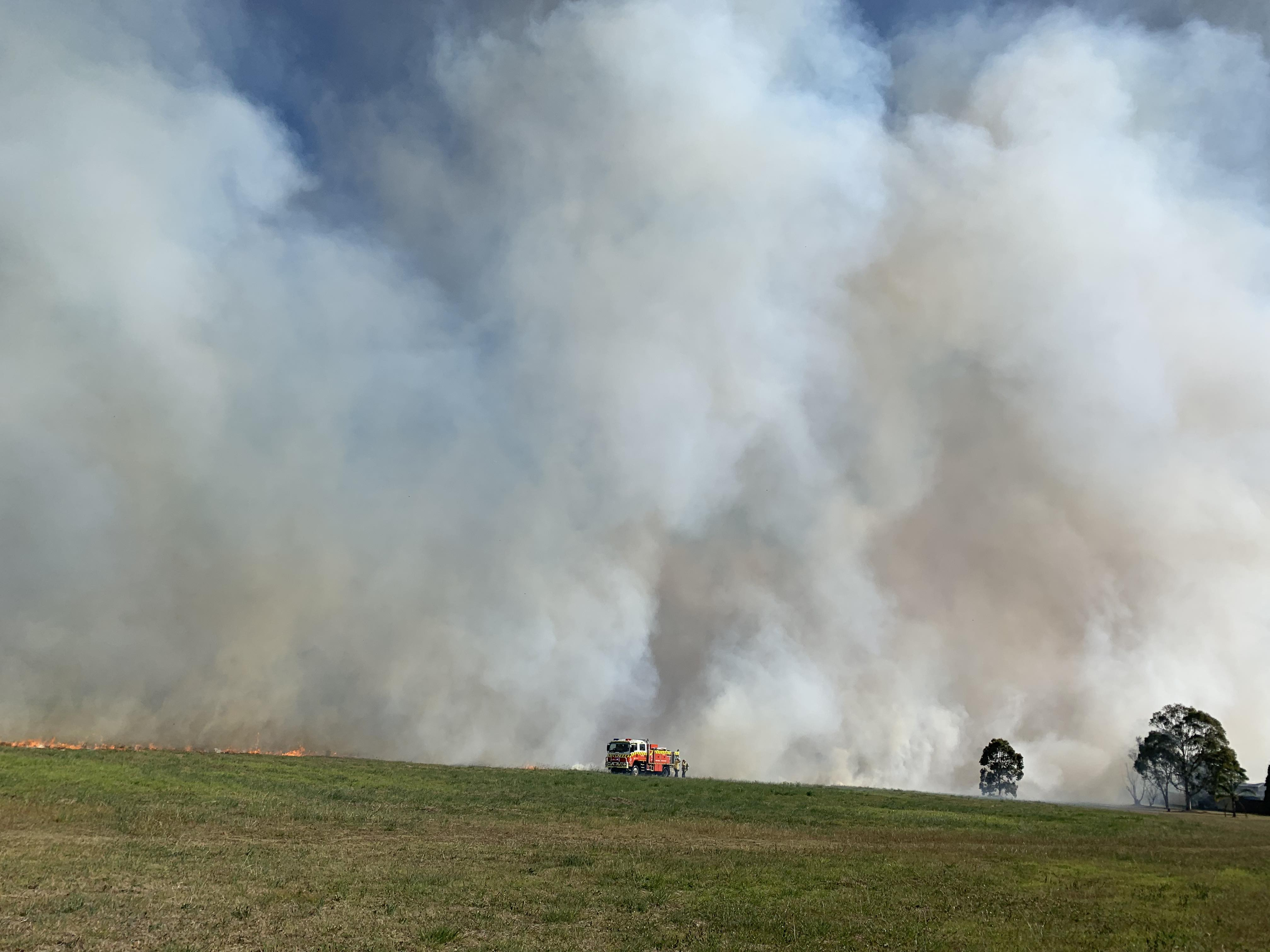
Fast moving grass fire, Ingleburn, NSW

29 October a large and fast moving grassfire broke out along the T8 train line in Ingleburn. Local residents were told to evacuate after the fire jumped the rail line and burnt towards properties in Bow Bowing. The trains were halted for a number of hours leading to disruptions and delays. The fire grew 38 ha (93 acres) before it was contained.

30 October a fast moving grass fire spread into thick bush, burning through 8 hectares and destroying a home at The Oaks.

==== 31 October fire outbreak ====
31 October was New South Wales' worst fire danger day for October. High to extreme fire dangers as well as total fire bans were issued for over 80% of the state, due to parched winds upwards of 50 km/h (31 mph) and temperatures soaring to 40 °C (104 °F). There were 87 fires with 36 of these fires burning out of control by the morning. The RFS Commissioner Rob Rogers said significant resources were deployed to slow the fires down, and stated that:

"Properties are well at risk today, and to be honest if we get out of today without losing a number of properties I'll be very happy"

Throughout the day ten emergency warnings were issued throughout the state including warnings issued for Nymboida, Tabulam, Mudgee, and Tenterfield. Residents were advised to seek shelter as the fires approached, having burnt over 25,000 ha (61,776 acres) and destroying four homes.

An Emergency Warning was issued for the Cooks Gap Fire near Mudgee when the 204 hectare (504 acre) fire burnt close to a site with stored explosives, leading to the establishment of a one-kilometre exclusion zone.

The Christies Fire started in Queensland where it impacted Wallangarra, destroying four homes. The fire then rapidly spread over the border into New South Wales and impacted the township of Jennings. Overnight an RFS truck crashed ten kilometres south of Jennings, trapping two firefighters in the wreckage and resulting in three hospitalizations.

A number of fires burning over 30,000 hectares (74,000 acres) surrounded the township of Tenterfield, with residents warned to prepare for scattered embers landing across the town. These included the Sawyers Creek Fire which burnt 2,689 hectares, the Woodside Fire which burnt 6,367 hectares, the Scrub Road Fire which burnt 1,963 hectares, the Benders Creek Fire which burnt 8,048 hectares and Rocky River Fire which burnt 1,729 hectares. Further fires impacted neighbouring communities, including the Oglive Drive Fire which burnt 1,311 hectares near Tabulam, the Magistrate Trail Fire which burnt 3,138 hectares near Deepwater and the Torrington Complex Fire which burnt 363 hectares, Bonshaw Road Fire which burnt 2,432 hectares and Yetman Road fire which burnt 1,729 hectares near Ashford.

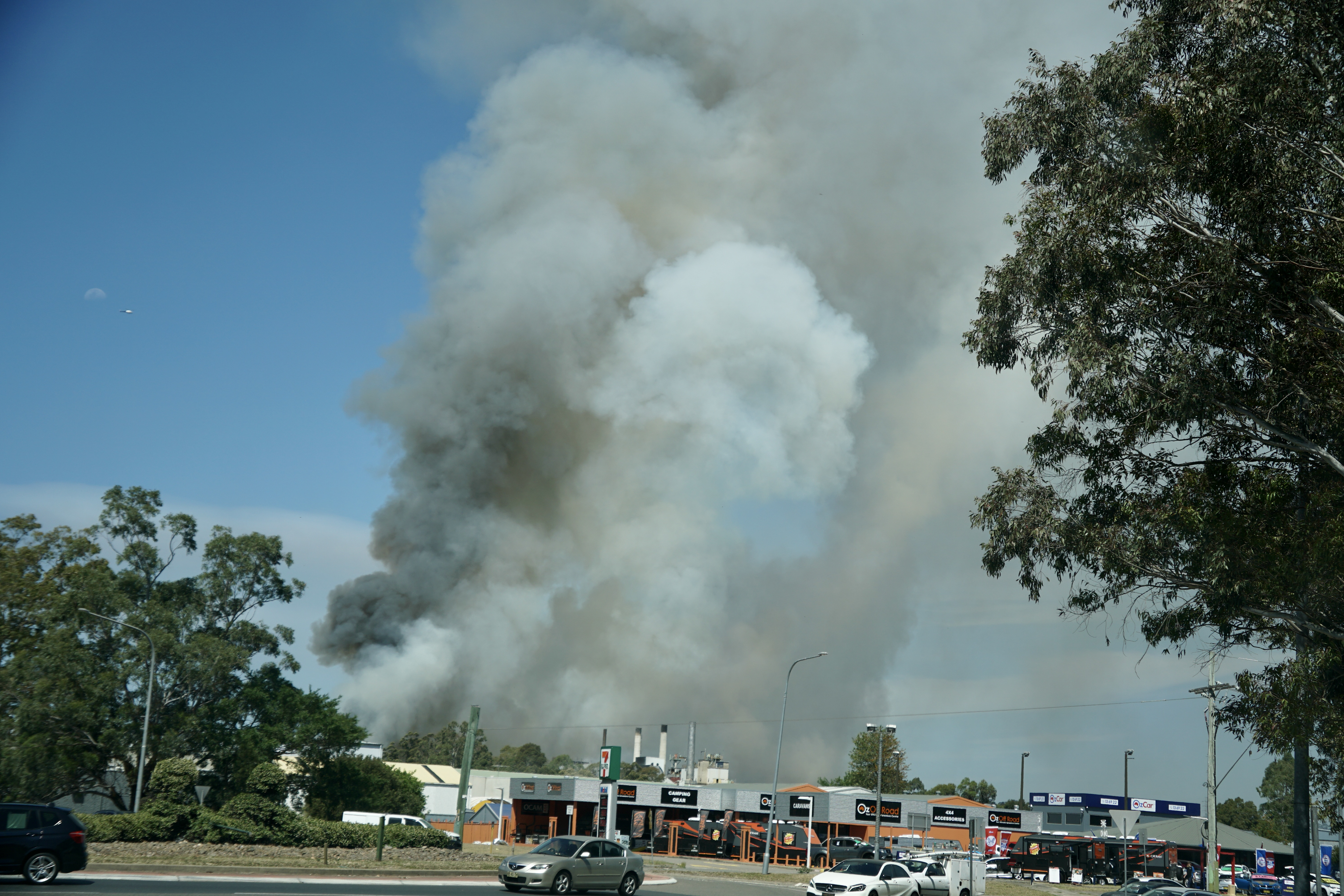
Bush fire approaches Penrith, NSW

Extreme winds reaching up to 104 km/h (64 mph) were recorded at Badgerys Creek, flaring up a number of fires at Oran Park, Leppington, Rossmore, Bringelly, Horsley Park, Wallacia and Silverdale. The winds were strong enough to rip the roof off a row of shops at Bringelly and flip over a small plane at Bankstown Airport, generating over 300 calls for help from emergency services.

Through October, New South Wales began to see frequent Total Fire Bans and significant fires. The first widespread Total Fire Ban was declared for nine regions across New South Wales on 1 October. Significant fires have since occurred throughout the state, predominately in the Mid West/North Coast. However, fires of significance have also occurred in the Bega Valley, Ingleburn, Mudgee and the Hunter Valley. Combined these fires burnt over 98,233 ha (242,739 acres), destroying 27 homes and claiming the lives of two.

1 November a fast-moving grass fire tore through paddocks at Orchard Hills near Penrith.

14 and 15 November a large fire complex near Lightning Ridge, New South Wales merged into a large fire and burnt over 18,100 hectares. On the 15th it impacted the township of Glengarry, in which it destroyed 6 properties. On 16 November a NSW RFS volunteer firefighter was killed by a falling tree while fighting the fire.

19 November a large and fast moving grassfire broke out in Menangle which quickly threatened properties including a retirement village. Multiple waterbombing aircraft were sent to control the fire which grew up to 67 hectares. The fire was believed to have been ignited by a spark from a passing train.

9 December the Duck Creek Pilliga Forest Fire started which quickly developed a Cumulonimbus flammagenitus. By 13 December the fire was controlled with significant aid from aircraft support, having burnt over 28,600 ha (69,930 acres).

11 December the Trap Valley Mountain Dumaresq Valley Fire broke out and threatened properties, due to being in extreme terrain it was largely inaccessible to ground crews leading to a challenging containment operation. By 13 December the fire was declared controlled with significant aircraft support; it burnt over 1,800 ha (4,447 acres).

12 December the NSW RFS confirmed the death of a volunteer firefighter in the Murray River while responding to a car fire which burnt into surrounding bushland.

14 December multiples bushfires broke out around the Cessnock area, which burnt more than 600 ha (1,482 acres) and destroyed two homes and a business.

16 December the Duck Creek Pilliga Forest Fire south of Narrabri broke containment lines after originally being contained on 14 December, threatening properties in Bohena Creek by 18 December. By 19 December the blaze burnt over 80,000 ha (197,684 acres) and generated a cumulonimbus flammagenitus, with smoke from the fire reaching as far as Tamworth, Dubbo and Sydney.

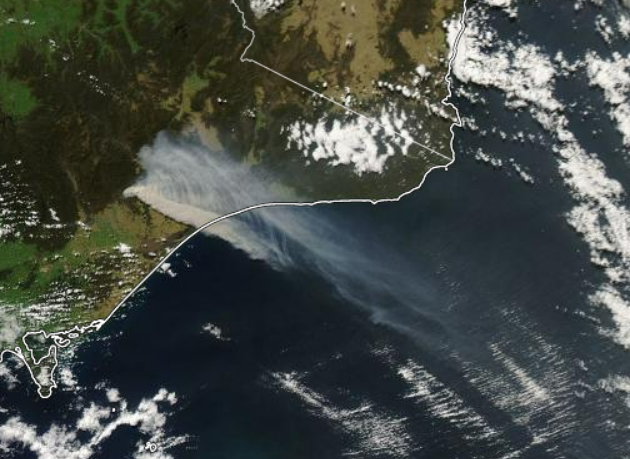
Satellite image of Gippsland fires, 1 October

=== Victoria ===
1 October saw four major bushfires begin burning in the eastern Victorian region of Gippsland. A large blaze near Briagolong resulted in the town and its surrounds being evacuated, while emergency warnings were issued for residents in proximity of other fires in Loch Sport and Rawson. Strong winds in the region resulted in the fires spreading rapidly and burning out of control. By the following day, a house and several other outbuildings and sheds had been destroyed. Damage to power lines also left around 2,000 properties without power around the Loch Sport area. Heavy rain across the state on 3 October helped to bring the flames under control, by which time the fires had burnt a combined total of over 20,000 ha (49,500 acres) of bushland.

13 February was a day of dangerous bushfires conditions, and a "Catastrophic" fire danger rating was issued for the Wimmera district for the first time since the 2019–20 Australian bushfire season. 3 fires broke out across the Grampians which impacted the towns of Dadswells Bridge, Bellfield, and Pomonal. 44 Homes were lost and five firefighters were injured in a burnover, where flames overtake a firefighting vehicle. These fires burnt over 6,600 ha (16,308 acres).

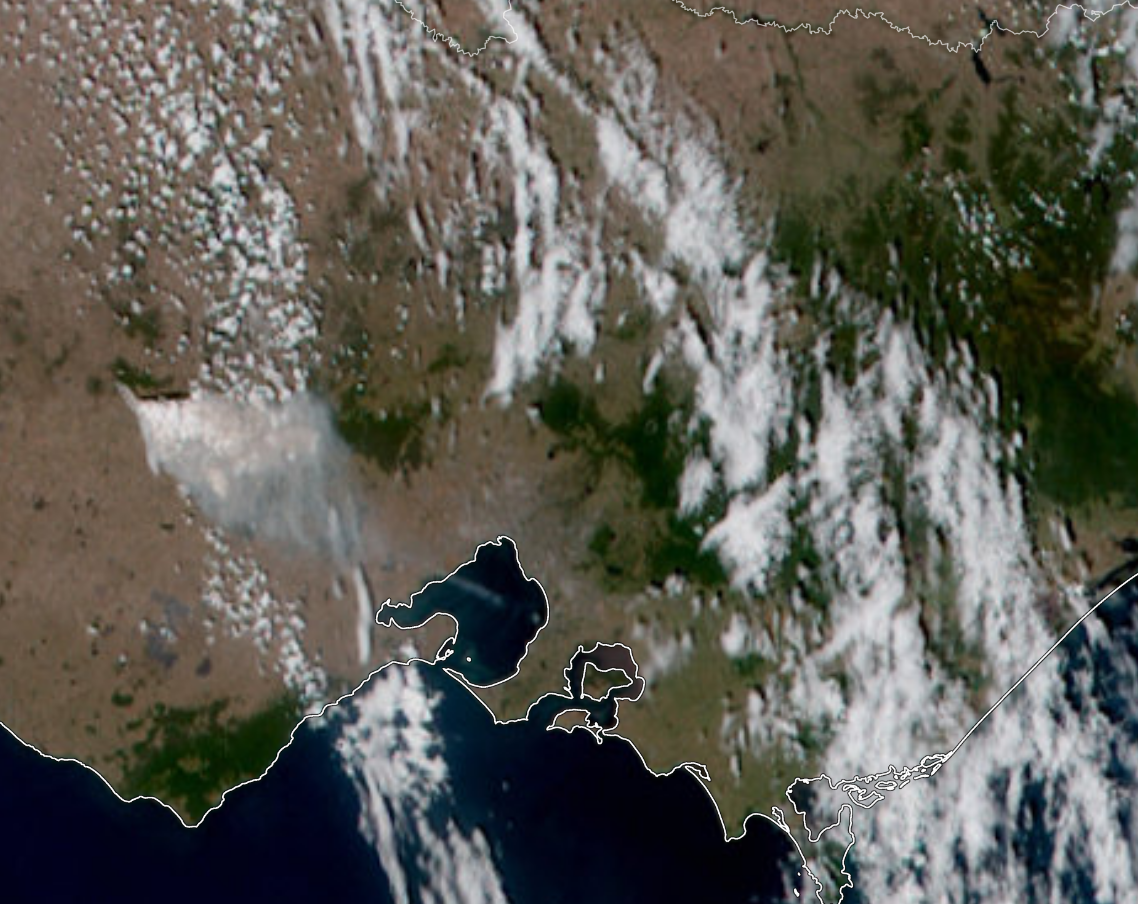
Satellite image of bushfire smoke from Mount Buangor Fire on 22 February 2024

22 February a fire broke out in the Mount Buangor State Park, north west of Ballarat. As of 23 February, the blaze has burnt a total of 14,027 Ha (34,661 acres) and impacted the townships of Raglan, Warrak, Bayindeen, Beaufort, Waterloo and Main Lead, Chute, Mount Lonarch, Middle Creek and Elmhurst, with around 5000 properties without power. On 27 February, large areas surrounding the firezone were warned to evacuate ahead of 'Extreme' fire conditions forecast for 28 February, expecting to cause a significant flare up in the fire behaviour. Victorian Premier Jacinta Allan warned "tomorrow is likely to be one of the most dangerous fire days Victoria has experienced in recent years." Additionally, a 'Catstrophic' fire danger rating was issued for the Wimmera district for a second time that fire season.

=== Tasmania ===
On 1 October a fire began burning in Mount Tanner on Flinders Island, before spreading rapidly out of control and threatening the communities of Leeka and Pine Scrub. Nearby residents were advised to evacuate.

On 12 November a fire began burning and destroyed 2 Homes and 1 shed at Dolphin Sands on the east coast of Tasmania. It burnt around 250 hectares.

On 21 February five fires began burning in the Bradys Lake area. As of 23 February, Burning around 10,000 Hectares, the fires were declared deliberate two homes and one shed was destroyed.

On 17 March a small fire began burning in Lymington in southern Tasmania, the fire grew to around 12 hectares and was contained quickly It posed a major risk to homes and was declared deliberate.

=== Northern Territory ===
Since the start of the season in August the NT had lost over 61 million hectares (150,734,282 acres). The primary causes of these fires were dry lightning strikes, while some are believed to have been arson.

14 August Bushfires NT chief issued a warning that the Northern Territory could lose up to 80% per cent of the territory by March.

4 September, a large fire began burning in the Barkly Tablelands, rapidly spreading out of control and threatening isolated cattle farms. On 11 September, residents in Tennant Creek were warned to prepare for the fire's arrival, after a fire front spread 60 km towards the township over a 24-hour period. The efforts of firefighters prevented Tennant Creek from being impacted. By 17 October, the fire had burnt over 2.8 million ha (7 million acres). The fire took 51 days to be declared extinguished, which occurred on 18 October.

=== South Australia ===
6 October South Australia announced the start of their bushfire season for six districts two weeks earlier than normal. Below-average rainfall and above-average temperatures caused significant grass loads to dry out, leading to an early and increased risk of fire.

=== Western Australia ===
Since the beginning of the fire season there has been over 10,000,000 ha (24,710,538 acres) burnt within the Kimberley.

7 October a large and dangerous fire began burning in the Shire of Gingin, with an emergency warning being issued to residents to evacuate immediately.

24 October five fires broke out in Kings Park, Western Australia which threatened the Perth Children's Hospital. The fire was found to have been sparked by an arsonist.

2 November a fire broke out near Jacob's Ladder, in Kings Park, Western Australia which threatened neighbouring apartments. By 3 November a 41-year-old man was charged in connection to five fires in Kings Park and around Jacob's Ladder.

3 November a number of fires broke out throughout the Peel region due to dry thunderstorms, with emergency warnings being issued for the Shire of Serpentine Jarrahdale, Nambeelup, and North Dandalup. Over 100 fires burnt through 1,900 ha (4,695 acres), destroying a number of outbuildings and a public park in Piara Waters. Interstate support from New South Wales was deployed on 5 November including a C130 Hercules waterbombing aircraft.

Due to these fires the fire season was declared to begin two months early in a number of regions, withDEFS Commissioner Klemm stating:

"The seasonal conditions are roughly five to eight weeks ahead of where they would typically be".

22 November a large bushfire started in Wanneroo, northern Perth, impacting numerous suburbs with residences warned they were in immediate danger. By 23 November, the fire had already grown to over 1,500 ha (3,706 acres) and destroyed 18 homes .

10 December a large bushfire threatened the Shire of Chapman Valley, burning over 1,000 ha (2,471 acres)

==== December Perth fires ====
20 December through to 22 December multiple large bushfires broke out in Southern Western Australia due to hot and strong winds, with seven of these fires prompting emergency warnings. The fires have destroyed at least five homes and injured several people, including firefighters which were responding to one of the fires in the Perth Hills. The firefighters had their truck roll over, with two of the firefighters hospitalized.

26 December a firefighter died while fighting a fire near Esperance, Western Australia.

14 January hundreds of firefighters were battling at least 25 bushfires near Perth. Local authorities warned residents to flee as there was a serious threat to life. By the 15th it was confirmed that two homes were lost, with at least nine outbuildings also destroyed, including the Club Moolia. These fires burnt over 6,000 ha (14,826 acres).

=== Queensland ===
21 July, a large grassfire broke out on Neurum Road at Neurum, with the Queensland Fire and Emergency Services (QFES) issuing a prepare to leave warning for the area.

Throughout September and October multiple fires occurred in the Beerwah and Landsborough area, up to 4 different fires were burning at once in late October. These fires were speculated to have been accidentally caused by hoons doing burnouts on Roys Road, along with some of the fires from late September–October being caused by arsonists.

7 October, a large and dangerous fire began in Duckinwilla, Queensland. An emergency warning was issued and local media was instructed to use the standard emergency warning signal to alert those in the vicinity, a measure reserved for only the most serious and life-threatening scenarios.

A fire near Mount French was contained on 13 October, after emergency warnings issued earlier to communities around the area were downgraded. The fire destroyed two sheds. A second fire in the Western Downs region also prompted emergency warnings, but was downgraded by that night.

14 October, due to widespread high temperatures and high winds, a fire ban was issued for various regions in South East Queensland, including Ipswich, Lockyer Valley, and the Scenic Rim. The conditions continued into the following day as a fire broke out in Deepwater, Queensland on 15 October, which burnt over 3,600 ha (8,895 acres) with two houses confirmed to be lost.

==== Tara fire ====
Two large bushfires broke out near Tara, Queensland on 22 October, sparked by dry thunderstorms that morning. The fires destroyed over 16 homes through the following days. By 25 October it was confirmed two people had died. By 27 October these fires had burnt over 30,000 ha (74,131 acres) and had destroyed 32 homes along with more than a dozen other structures.

27 October four fires broke out near Mount Isa with people warned to evacuate. These fires were notable for requiring the deployment of water bombing aircraft, the first time they had ever been used in this region. All four fires were started by overheated machinery coming into contact with the highly combustible spinifex grass.

By 31 October significant fire conditions were expected on the Tara fireground due to strong winds and high temperatures, while pre-existing fires had already destroyed 52 homes. Fire crews were warning the surrounding community to evacuate immediately, prompting expectations of widespread property losses. By the end of the day the fire had destroyed up to 58 homes.

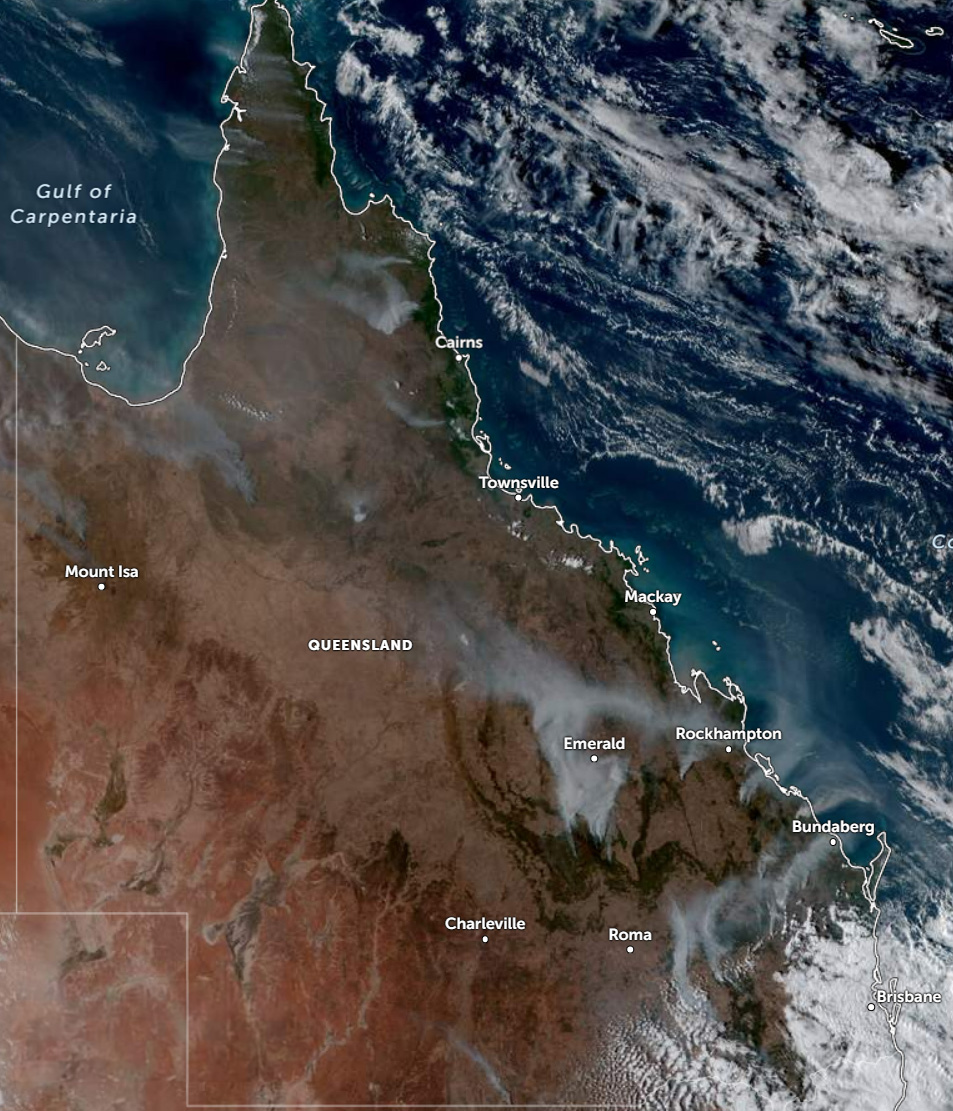
Satellite image of the Queensland fires, 28 October

On 31 October there were significant fire conditions expected throughout southern Queensland, with strong winds and high temperatures expected to fan fires. The most significant fire was the Christies Fire, which destroyed four homes in Wallangarra. The same fire proceeded to rapidly spread over the border into New South Wales, threatening the township of Jennings. The same day saw the loss of a further two homes in far north Queensland, two near Bundaberg, and one home in the Darling Downs.

By the end of October Queensland saw over 1,000 bushfires, many of these sparked by dry thunderstorms. Several of these fires were significant such, as the Tara and Mount Isa fires, which burnt well over 40,000 ha (98,842 acres) combined, destroyed 65 homes and claimed the lives of two people. The QFES Deputy Commissioner reported this season as the worst in 70 years. International and interstate support were deployed from New Zealand and Victoria. As of early November, this season had more homes lost than the 2019–20 Australian bushfire season, which destroyed 49.

4 November a firefighting aircraft was deployed from Toowoomba to Mount Isa to map fires burning in Western Queensland. The aircraft crashed near the Eloise Copper Mine killing all three people on board.

== New Fire Danger Index and problems faced ==
1 September 2022, the Australian Fire Danger Rating System (AFDRS) was introduced. The AFDRS is a rationalisation of Australia's previously existing fire warning systems and implemented consistent messaging across the country, ensuring nationwide understanding of fire risk.

The ratings are collected from a range of data such as weather conditions, fuel loads, and vegetation types which are compiled into the Fire Behaviour Index (FBI), a scale from 0–100.

=== Ratings ===
Fire Danger Ratings – Fire Behaviour Index – FBI

No Danger: <12

Moderate: 12–23

High: 24–49

Extreme: 50–99

Catastrophic: 100+

=== Problems faced ===
The 2023–24 bushfire season is the first full fire season with the AFDRS fully implemented, with significant issues being brought to light. An investigation revealed that the highly detailed data required for the system to produce accurate fire danger ratings was often unavailable, leading to erroneous predictions. The issue has since been resolved, although authorities have acknowledged areas for improvement on the new system.

4 September, the AFDRS incorrectly predicted a 'Catastrophic' fire danger rating for southern Queensland.

Australia's first qualified fire behaviour analyst, Andrew Sturgess, slammed mistakes in the system, stating "there are clear gaps in who enters the data, so we don’t have the quality of inputs that we need to get really confident fire danger ratings out of the new system".

Sturgess further criticised the Catastrophic fire danger rating issued for the New South Wales Far South Coast on 19 September, saying "conditions were bad, but would not have been classified at the highest level under the old system". The warning forced the closure of over 20 schools, affecting over 3,000 students and "making families scramble for care for their children". The NSW RFS rejected Sturgess' claim.

Inconsistencies in the ratings were identified when the Catastrophic fire danger rating was issued for the New South Wales Far South Coast, but not for neighbouring communities on the Victorian side of the border, despite identical conditions.

28 September The National Council for Fire and Emergency Services in Australia and New Zealand (AFAC), which oversaw the system's development and implementation, admitted there were "some improvements to inputs needed".

Rob Webb, the Chief of the Australasian Fire Authorities Council, said the new system still remained superior to the old ratings and analysts were working through early problems to improve the system.

== See also ==
- 2023–2024 El Niño event
