= Edward Hawtrey =

Edward Hawtrey may refer to:

- Edward Craven Hawtrey (1789 – 1862), English educationalist and headmaster
- Edward Hawtrey (sportsman) (1847 – 1916), English cricketer and schoolmaster
