= William Keen =

William Keen or Keene may refer to:

== Entertainment ==
- William Keene (1915–1992), American TV actor
- Bill Keene (1927–2000), American television and radio personality
- William B. Keene (1925–2018), American attorney, judge and television judge
- Will Keen (born 1970), English actor

== Other ==
- William Keen (merchant) (1680s–1754), merchant and judicial officer in the British colony of Newfoundland
- William Keen (cricketer) (1792–1846), English amateur cricketer
- William Williams Keen (1837–1932), pioneer American brain surgeon
- William John Keen (1873–1958), Chief Commissioner of the North-West Frontier Province of British India
- Bill Keen (1892–1947), American baseball player

== See also ==
- William Keane (disambiguation)
- William Kean (1871–1954), British trade unionist
