= Chinery =

Chinery is a surname. Notable people with the surname include:

- Chip Chinery (born 1964), American comedian, actor, and personal finance advisor
- Jean-Guy Hudon (born 1941), Canadian politician
- Leanne Chinery (born 1981), Canadian international lawn bowler

== See also ==
- Chinnery
