= William Tennent (sportsman) =

English cricketer

Personal information
- Born: 6 October 1845; Hobart, Australia
- Died: 5 July 1883 (aged 37); Hastings, East Sussex, England

Sport
- Sport: Cricket; Athletics
- Event: 100 yards/120 yards hurdles
- Club: Lancashire County Cricket Club; Amateur Athletic Club (London)

William Middleton Tennent (6 October 1845 – 5 July 1883) was an English athlete and cricketer who played for Lancashire County Cricket Club.

== Biography ==
He was born in Hobart and died in Hastings. He appeared in one first-class match during 1867, scoring three runs for Lancashire CCC.

Tennent was a significant athlete, becoming the British 100 yards champion and British 120 yards hurdles champion in 1868, after winning two AAC Championships title at the 1868 AAC Championships.
