= Walter Moresby Chinnery =

English athlete and stockbroker (1843-1905)

Walter Moresby Chinnery (19 August 1843 – 30 March 1905) was a nineteenth-century British middle-distance runner who set Amateur Athletic Club world records for the mile and the 4 mile events. He never became a professional athlete.

== Athletics ==
By the age of 16 he was a mile runner and had defeated Charles Guy Pym, who was two years older and a leading athlete of the day. He was a founding member of the world’s oldest track and field club, the Mincing Lane Athletic Club, which by 1866 had became the London Athletic Club with Chinnery as the first Honorary Secretary.

He competed in the AAC Championships in 1866 and 1867, the first two years they were held. In 1868 he was the first person to establish an Amateur Athletic Club record of less than 4 minutes 30 seconds for the 1 mile, his time of 4:29 3/5 minutes was at the time a world record.

He didn't match his own record in the 1868 AAC Championships but he won the mile and he also set a world record for the 4 mile event with a time of 21:12.0 minutes. He retained both titles (in slower times) at the 1869 AAC Championships.

He and his brother were also amongst the early contenders in the London to Brighton walk and their journey in 1869 made them the first people recorded as having completed the distance on foot in less than 12 hours.

== Biography ==
Chinnery was born on 19 August 1843 in Norwood and was schooled at Eton College. He and his brother Harry founded the Chinnery Brothers Company in the City of London, a firm of stockjobbers trading securities between the London and New York Stock Exchanges.

He married Mary Chinnery (née Dixon), Harry Chinnery, the first-class cricketer, was one of their sons. After his wife Mary died he married his second wife Alice Emily Chinnery (née Wilson) and a son from his second marriage, Esmé Chinnery, was also a first-class cricketer.

Around 1890 he purchased Hatchford Park House, Cobham. He stood, unsuccessfully, as the Conservative party candidate in the Battersea constituency for election to Parliament in the 1892 General Election. He was a Justice of the Peace and held the office of High Sheriff of Surrey, and Deputy Lieutenant of the County of Surrey.

Chinnery died on 30 March 1905, in Hatchford, Cobham, Surrey, aged 61.
