= Esmé Chinnery =

English cricketer (1886–1915)

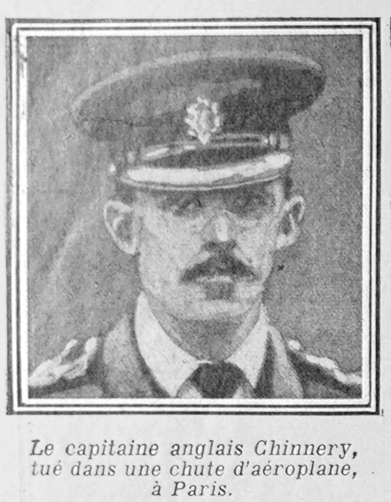

Personal information
- Full name: Esme Fairfax Chinnery
- Born: 28 March 1886; Cobham, Surrey
- Died: 18 January 1915 (aged 28); Issy, Paris, France
- Relatives: Harry Chinnery (half-brother)
- Source: Cricinfo, 12 March 2017

Captain Esmé Chinnery (28 March 1886 – 18 January 1915) was an English soldier and aviator. He played one first-class cricket match for Surrey in 1906. He was killed in an aircraft accident during World War I.

== Education and private life ==
His father was the athlete and City stockbroker, Walter Moresby Chinnery of Hatchford Park, Cobham who died in 1905. His half-brother, Harry Chinnery, who was also a first-class cricketer, was a son of his father's first wife, Mary Chinnery (née Dixon). After his father's death his mother Alice Emily Chinnery (née Wilson) remarried and his step-father was Christopher Stone who was only four years older than him.

After school, Chinnery went up to Brasenose College in the University of Oxford. Whilst at Oxford he became a Freemason in the Apollo University Lodge, a Masonic lodge for students and former students of the university. He played cricket at university, and whilst still an undergraduate he was selected to play in the first team for Surrey County Cricket Club.

== Military career ==
Chinnery was commissioned as a Coldstream Guards officer in 1910 and was seconded to the Royal Flying Corps in 1913. He obtained his aviators certificate at Brooklands Aerodrome on 30 April 1912, flying a Deperdussin Monoplane.

== Death ==
Chinnery was flying as a passenger in a Voisin biplane when the aircraft broke up and both he and the pilot fell to earth, Chinnery died and the French aviator Laporte died later in hospital. Following his death a memorial service was held at the Embassy Church in Paris and his body was repatriated to England for a military funeral, and burial in his family's plot at St. Matthew Church at Hatchford in Surrey.

== See also ==
- List of Surrey County Cricket Club players
- List of cricketers who were killed during military service
