= Dolphin Sands =

- Town
- Coordinates: 42°04′58″S 148°08′47″E
- Country: Australia
- State: Tasmania
- Region: South-east
- LGA: Glamorgan–Spring Bay
- Location: 65 km (40 mi) N of Triabunna

Government
  - State electorate: Lyons
  - Federal division: Lyons

Population
  - Total: 182 (2021 census)
- Postcode: 7190
Localities around Dolphin Sands
Swansea	Coles Bay, Swansea	Coles Bay
Swansea	Dolphin Sands	Coles Bay
Swansea	Great Oyster Bay	Coles Bay

Dolphin Sands is a rural locality in the local government area (LGA) of Glamorgan–Spring Bay in the South-east LGA region of Tasmania. The locality is about 65 kilometres (40 mi) north of the town of Triabunna. The 2021 census recorded a population of 182 for the state suburb of Dolphin Sands.

== History ==
Dolphin Sands is a confirmed locality.

Dolphins Sands has been affected by bushfires with 3 homes destroyed in 2009, 2 homes destroyed in 2023 and 19 homes destroyed in 2025.

== Geography ==
The southern boundary follows the shoreline of Great Oyster Bay. The eastern boundary and much of the northern follows the channel that leads to Moulting Lagoon and the Swan River.

== Road infrastructure ==
Route A3 (Tasman Highway) passes to the west. From there, Swan River Road and Dolphin Sands Road provide access to the locality.

== See also ==
- Moulting Lagoon Important Bird Area
