= 1868 AAC Championships =

Outdoor track and field competition

- Dates: 19–20 June 1868
- Host city: London, England
- Venue: Beaufort House, Walham Green, London
- Level: Senior
- Type: Outdoor

The 1868 AAC Championships was an outdoor track and field competition organised by the Amateur Athletic Club (AAC). The championships were held from 19 to 20 June 1868, in the grounds of Thomas Jones, 7th Viscount Ranelagh's Beaufort House.

== Summary ==
- The championships were run over two days for the first time.
- A cup was presented to each winner and a medal was awarded to second place.
- Walter Chinnery set a world record for the 4 miles event with a time of 21:12.0.
- Robert Mitchell set a world record for the pole jump event with a jump of 3.21.

== Results ==
Event	1st			2nd			3rd		
100 yards	William Tennent	AAC	10.2	Edward J. Colbeck	London AC	1 ft	William MacLaren	Manchester AC	1½ yd
quarter-mile	Edward J. Colbeck	London AC	50.4 NR	William MacLaren	Manchester AC	12 yd	Walter M. Chinnery	London AC	gave up
half-mile	Edward J. Colbeck	London AC	2:02.0	Arthur King	London AC	4½ yd	Walter R. M. Bethune	Civil Service AA	3½ yd
1 mile	Walter M. Chinnery	London AC	4:33.2	Edward Hawtrey	Eton College	27 yd	only 2 competitors		
4 miles	Walter M. Chinnery	London AC	21:12.0 WR	Joseph Snow	Manchester AC	270 yd	Sydenham Dixon	Civil Service AA	retired
120yd hurdles	William Tennent	AAC	17.4	William MacLaren	Manchester AC	½ yd	William F. Powell Moore	AAC	5 yd
7 miles walk	Walter Rye	London AC	57:40	Thomas Griffith	AAC	58:00	H. M. Wilkinson	Civil Service AA	a mile
high jump	Robert J. C. Mitchell	Manchester AC	1.727	Charles Guy Pym	Civil Service AA	1.676	Frederick W. Parsons	Magdalen C	1.575
pole jump	Robert J. C. Mitchell	Manchester AC	3.21 WR	William F. Powell Moore	AAC	3.06	Alfred Lubbock	AAC	2.59
broad jump	Robert J. C. Mitchell	Manchester AC	6.01	Edward Havers	Ingatestone	5.92	William Tennent	AAC	4.91
shot put	John Stone	Liverpool AC	11.56 NR	Robert J. C. Mitchell	Manchester AC	10.97	William F. Powell Moore	AAC	10.40
hammer throw	Henry Leeke	Trinity College	30.33 NR	Douglas Moffatt	AAC	29.49	Patrick Halkett	London Scottish	28.42
