= 2025–26 Australian bushfire season =

Australian bushfires by season

- Date: August 2025 – May 2026
- Location: Australia

Statistics
- Burned area: unspecified

Impacts
- Deaths: 5 (Note: Death total by state: New South Wales: 1, South Australia: 1, Western Australia: 2, Victoria: 1)
- Injuries: 1
- Structures destroyed: 959 approximately: 386 homes (Note: Homes total by state: New South Wales: 20, South Australia: 2, Tasmania: 21 & Victoria: 340); 11 outbuildings (Note: Outbuildings total by state: New South Wales: 7 & Victoria: 4); 562 approximately (Note: Total by state: Victoria: Approximately 562 (900-(338 homes)))

Ignition
- Cause: Substantial fuel loads; Record high temperatures; Climate change; dry lightning; arson; Record-breaking heat

The 2025–26 Australian bushfire season (Note: Bushfires in Australia can occur all year-round. For what "season" means, see seasonality of bushfires in Australia.) is the Previous bushfire season in Australia. As of 11 January 2026, five people have died.

== Seasonal outlooks ==
=== Spring ===
On 27 August 2025, the AFAC released its bushfire outlook for the coming spring. The organisation predicted an increased risk for fire in parts of the Kimberley and Pilbara regions of Western Australia, the Murraylands in South Australia, and southwestern and central Victoria.

=== Summer ===
The AFAC released its summer bushfire outlook on 27 November 2025, noting a heightened risk of bushfires in parts of Western Australia, central northern New South Wales, and southwestern and central Victoria. Communities across Australia were advised to be vigilant, even in areas identified as having a "normal risk" of fires. After damaging bushfires occurred on the New South Wales Central Coast and the Tasmanian East Coast, the AFAC and the Tasmania Fire Service further stressed the potential for fires during the summer.

== New South Wales ==
On 6 December, over 50 bushfires were burning across NSW by the afternoon. A fire at Koolewong reached emergency level with initial reports of 12 homes lost. A fire at Bulahdelah saw up to 4 homes destroyed and over 4643 hectares burn. Another fire at Milsons Gully in the upper Hunter saw over 15117 hectares burn and reached emergency level. On 7 December authorities confirmed that 16 homes were destroyed, 9 homes were damaged, and 7 outbuildings were destroyed in Koolewong while in Bulahdelah 4 homes were destroyed. On 7 December a firefighter working for the NSW National Parks and Wildlife Service was doing bushfire prevention in Nerong and was killed by a falling tree. The state government also activated disaster recovery support in six local government areas, with the Lake Macquarie LGA being added on 9 December. New South Wales Premier Chris Minns stated that it was a "foreboding beginning" to the fire season.

=== Koolewong fire ===
At around 12:40pm on 6 December, a bushfire started in a park area in Koolewong, quickly spiraling out of control. By 2:30pm, media reports revealed the fire had destroyed at least six homes, later being upgraded to 12, and by 8 December, 16 houses had been destroyed. The fire led to the cancellation of train services on the Central Coast Line between Gosford and Hawkesbury River. The Central Coast Council established a bushfire recovery program for residents, including the delivery of skip bins and waivers of development application fees, and will continue to work with impacted residents.

== South Australia ==
On 23 November, a Country Fire Service firefighter died while attending to a scrub fire at Pinkawillinie Conservation Park in South Australia.

On 18 January, a fire at Tooperang believed to be sparked by a vehicle destroyed 2 homes and a motorhome, and burnt 600 hectares.

== Tasmania ==
On 4 December, over 30 fires were reported in Tasmania, with three reaching an emergency level; Dolphin Sands, Levendale and Glenlusk. An evacuation centre was opened at Swansea town hall. By 6 December, the Dolphin Sands fire still remained uncontained with 19 houses or shacks, 15 outbuildings and 4 vehicles damaged or destroyed but with assessments still ongoing and residents who evacuated told not to return. On 7 December, authorities confirmed that 19 homes had been destroyed, and 14 more damaged in Dolphin Sands. On 15 December, fire authorities confirmed that the Dolphin sands fire was resulted from a registered burn which was not properly extinguished by the landowner.

On 9 December a fire began near Diana's Basin that elevated to emergency warning for communities including Stieglitz, Parkside and Parnella near St Helens on the east coast of Tasmania. The next day structures including at least 2 houses had been reported to have been destroyed in Stieglitz, and emergency warnings continued. Hundreds of people fled to an evacuation centre set up at Break O'Day Community Stadium, while people were reported to have stayed overnight at the Stieglitz boat ramp as a last resort.

== Victoria ==
On 4 December, a fire broke out near Markwood, south-east of Wangaratta, reaching 370 hectares (910 acres) before it was contained. On 6 December, authorities confirmed that at least two homes and four outbuildings were destroyed.

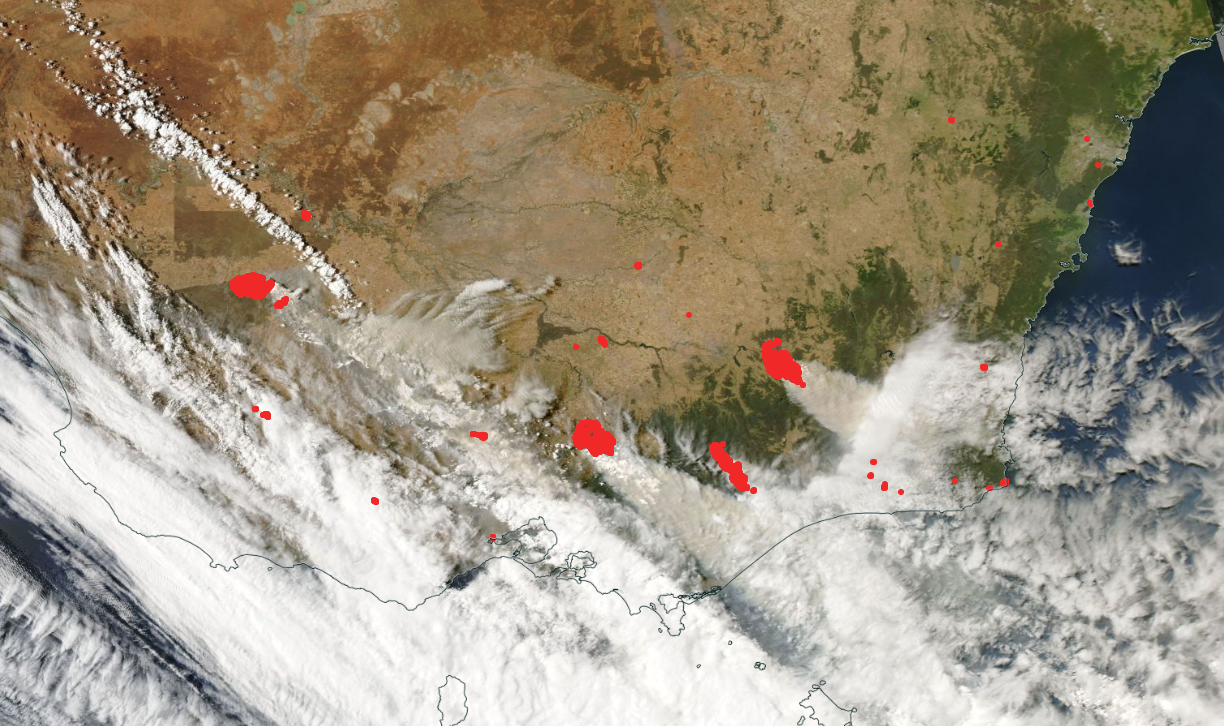
Smoke from 5 major out of control bushfires in Victoria

On 18 December, a fire broke out north of Benalla, with emergency warnings issued to leave now, fire crews declared the fire as out of control.

On 7–9 January, a combination of extreme heatwave and strong winds created an environment conducive to catastrophic fire development in the state, with the 9th forecast to experience catastrophic fire danger in three districts (Wimmera, Northern Country and North Central districts) and extreme fire danger in the rest of the state, with resultant fires leading to road closures and property losses.

On 7 January, a grass fire broke out just south of Stuart Mill, with fire conditions extreme. A watch and act warning was put it place telling residents to prepare to evacuate.

After 9 January fires, premier Jacinta Allan declared a state of disaster, spanning 18 local government areas, as well as an alpine resort, allowing authorities additional powers to manage the fires. As of 10 January 2026, it is estimated that over 300 structures have been destroyed and over 300,000 hectares (740,000 acres) of bushland have been burned. The premier announced plans to request a formal review of the fires led by an independent body, after pressure for a response on the state's bushfire preparedness and Country Fire Authorities resources.

=== Skipton fire ===
On 9 January, the rural communities around Skipton were impacted by a significant bushfire that burned through grassland and agricultural land. Emergency services issued *Watch and Act* warnings for Carranballac, Stoneleigh and the rural areas surrounding Skipton, advising residents that the fire was contained but it was not yet safe to return due to ongoing hazards such as fallen trees and damaged infrastructure. The fire resulted in the destruction of multiple properties between Streatham and Skipton, and extensive livestock losses in the surrounding agricultural regions. Weeks after the event, locals described the fire as devastating, with approximately a dozen homes destroyed and significant impacts to community infrastructure and farmlands.

=== Harcourt fire ===
On 9 January, a bushfire ignited near Fogartys Gap Road in Ravenswood South, south of Bendigo, and spread towards the town of Harcourt under extreme heat and strong winds. Emergency warnings were issued for Harcourt and surrounding areas, with residents advised to leave immediately as the fire approached the township.

The fire caused widespread damage within and around Harcourt, destroying dozens of homes and other structures and damaging key local infrastructure, including coolstores and agricultural facilities. Firefighting efforts involved more than 100 crews supported by aircraft, with authorities warning that it remained unsafe for residents to return for several days due to ongoing fire activity, falling trees and damaged powerlines.

=== Natimuk grassfire ===
On 9 January 2026, a large grassfire ignited at Telfers Road, Grass Flat at 12:43 pm. At approximately 1:09 pm, residents of Natimuk were advised to leave following the issuance of a Watch and Act warning. An Emergency Warning was issued around 30 minutes later as the fire began impacting the township.

A wind change at about 2:00 pm caused the fire to spread eastward towards Horsham, prompting multiple emergency warnings for areas west of the city, including Vectis. Fire spread was slowed by approximately 8:00 pm as conditions moderated. The fire resulted in the destruction of more than 20 structures in the towns of Natimuk and Quantong, along with widespread damage to farmland and infrastructure across the western Wimmera region.

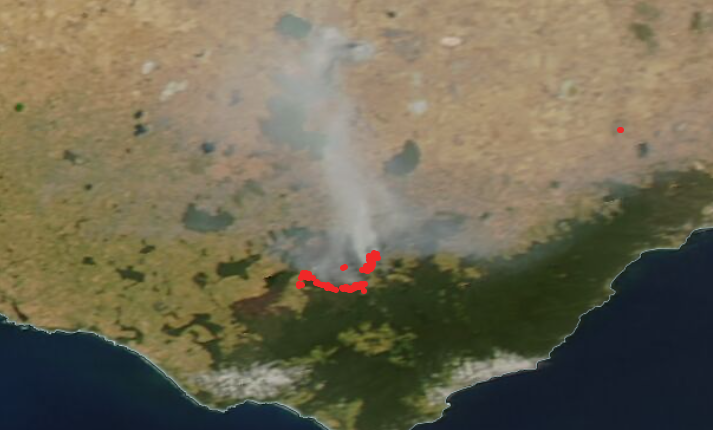
Out of control bushfires burning in the Otway's

=== Gellibrand fire ===
On 25 January a bushfire in the Otways National Park broke containment lines due to extreme heat. On 26 January, evacuation warnings were sent out to the towns of Gellibrand, Forrest, Beech Forest were told to evacuate. On 27 January, the township of Gellibrand were told it was too late to leave with the bushfire rapidly approaching the town.

On 28 January conditions eased and crews were able to slow the spread of the fire, all evacuation orders were lifted with the last remaining watch and act being in place, with residents told its not safe to return as of 29 January.

At least 16 structures have been accounted as destroyed as of 29 January.

=== Longwood fire ===
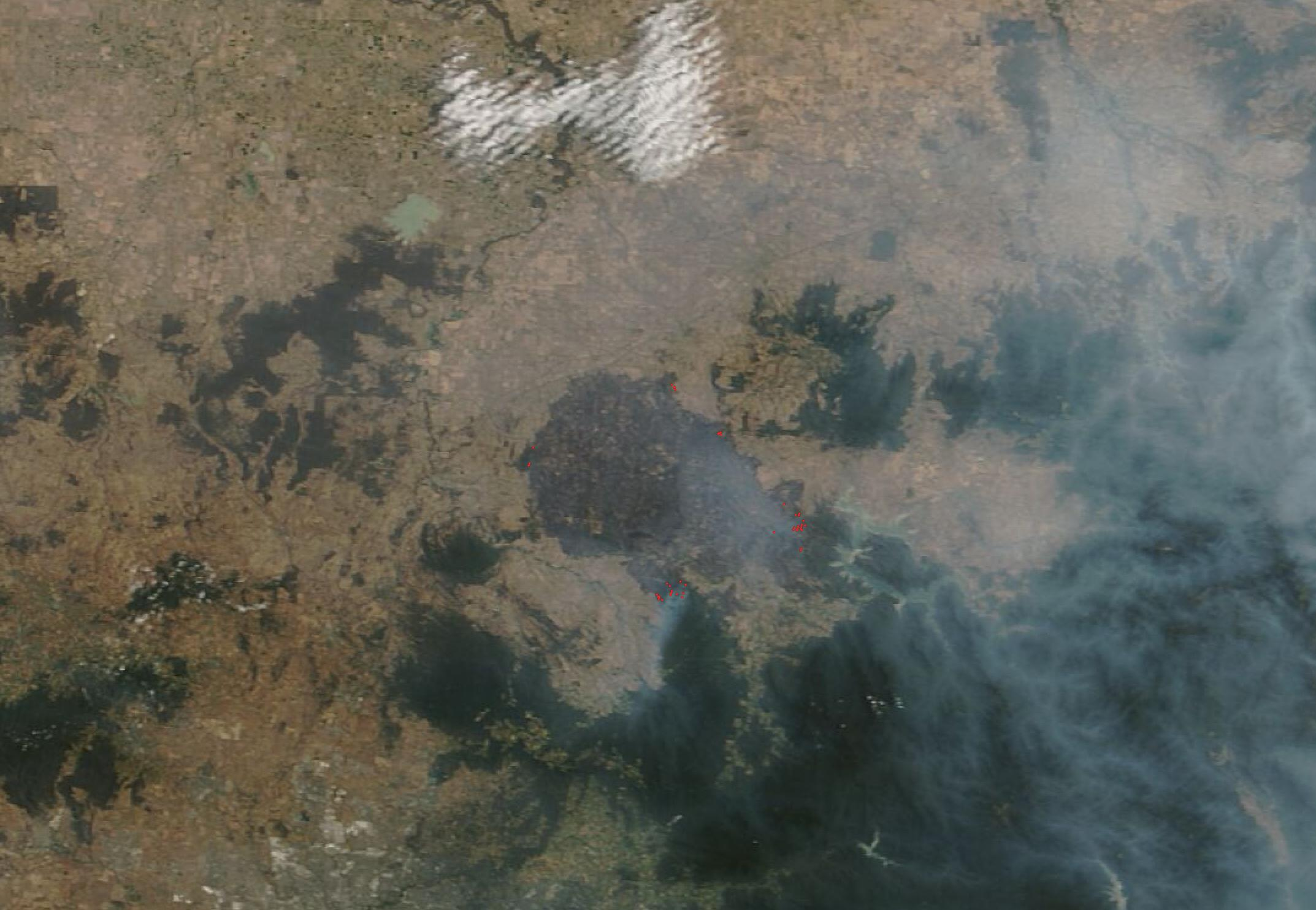
Burn scar of the Longwood fire, visible on satellite imagery

On 7 January, a large bushfire broke out at Longwood. More than 53 trucks have been sent to fight the fire, along with five aircraft performing water drops. Residents of the township of Ruffy were told to 'leave now' as the township was expected to be hit within the next 2–4 hours.

On 8 January, residents of Alexandra, Eildon, Jamieson, Lake Eildon and Yea were told to prepare to leave with weather conditions expected to reach a catastrophic level on 9 January. The ABC reported that a residential property in Ruffy, east of Seymour and within the large Longwood fire zone, has been destroyed. That day, CFA chief officer Jason Heffernan noted that the Longwood fire had the potential to develop pyrocumulonimbus clouds and produce dry lightning. Heffernan also stated that the fire was unable to be contained at the time.

On 9 January, it was reported that at least 20 buildings were destroyed in the town of Ruffy. A local firefighter sustained third-degree burns while fighting the bushfire, requiring hospitalisation. Three people, including a child, were initially reported missing in the Longwood East area as a result of the fire, but have all since been found in Benalla. As of 27 January 2026, the Longwood fire has burned over 140,000 hectares.

On 11 January, human remains were found near a vehicle at Gobur, southeast of Ruffy, marking the first death from the Longwood fire.

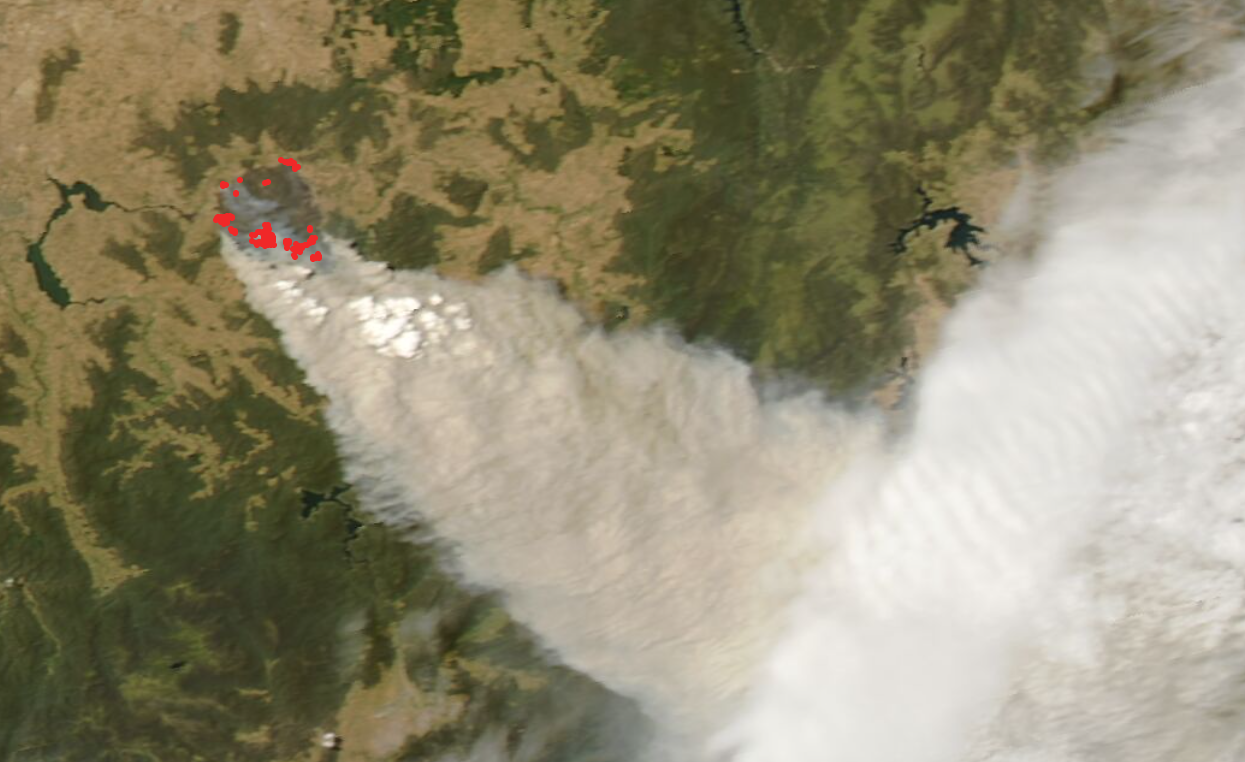
Smoke from Walwa fire creating Pyrocumulonimbus clouds

By 18 January the toll of the Victorian fires in 2026 was approximately 900 structures destroyed including 338 homes destroyed, more than 15000 livestock lost, more than 400,000 hectares burnt and 1 person killed.

=== Walwa fire ===
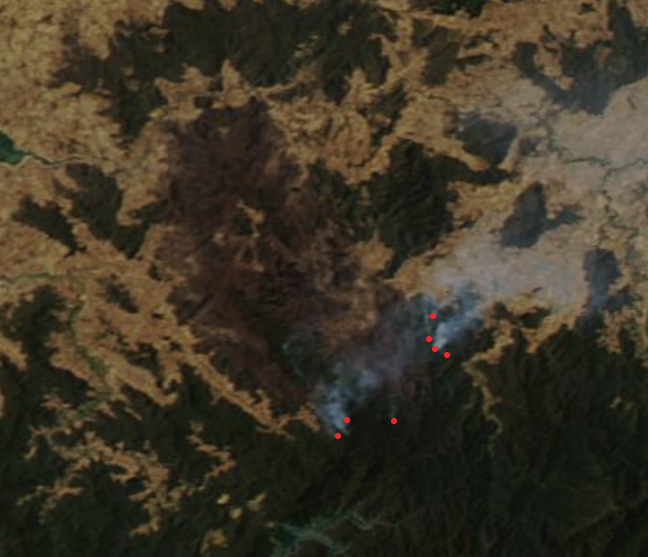
Burn scar from Walwa fire

During late January 2026, the Walwa fire burned across parts of north-eastern Victoria as part of a series of major bushfires in the state. The blaze remained out of control amid a prolonged heatwave and elevated fire danger ratings. Emergency services issued warnings as conditions deteriorated, including "leave immediately" and "watch and act" messages for communities in the Nariel Valley and surrounding areas due to potential fire spread. The fire was one of several major blazes that authorities reported were not yet under control during the peak of the 2025–26 bushfire season, contributing to widespread evacuations and fire danger across the state.

== Western Australia ==
On 1 December, a death was attributed to a fire at West River, with a man who was creating a firebreak with a front-end loader killed after the vehicle was engulfed in flames. This fire would go onto burn approximately 300 hectares of farmland.

On 11 December two bushfires on the outskirts of Perth elevated to emergency level. Kenwick, Wattle Grove, Maddington and Beckenham were under warning by the Kenwick fire in Perth's south-east, while Bullsbrook and Upper Swan were under warning by the Bullsbrook fire in Perth's north-east.

On 17 December a 34-year-old farmer helping fire crews fight a fire in Mindarabin died while driving along Old Ongerup Road after a tree fell on his vehicle and crushed the cab.

On Christmas day (25 December), residents of Boddington were forced to evacuate after a nearby fire, which reached Emergency Warning level, quadrupled in size under challenging weather conditions and extreme heat. The fire was downgraded to a Watch and Act the next day.

== See also ==
- List of bushfires in Australia
- Climate of Australia
- List of natural disasters in Australia
