= Harry Chinnery =

English cricketer

Personal information
- Born: 6 February 1876; Teddington, Middlesex
- Died: 28 May 1916 (aged 40); Monchy-le-Preux, France
- Relatives: Esmé Chinnery (half-brother)
- Source: Cricinfo, 12 March 2017

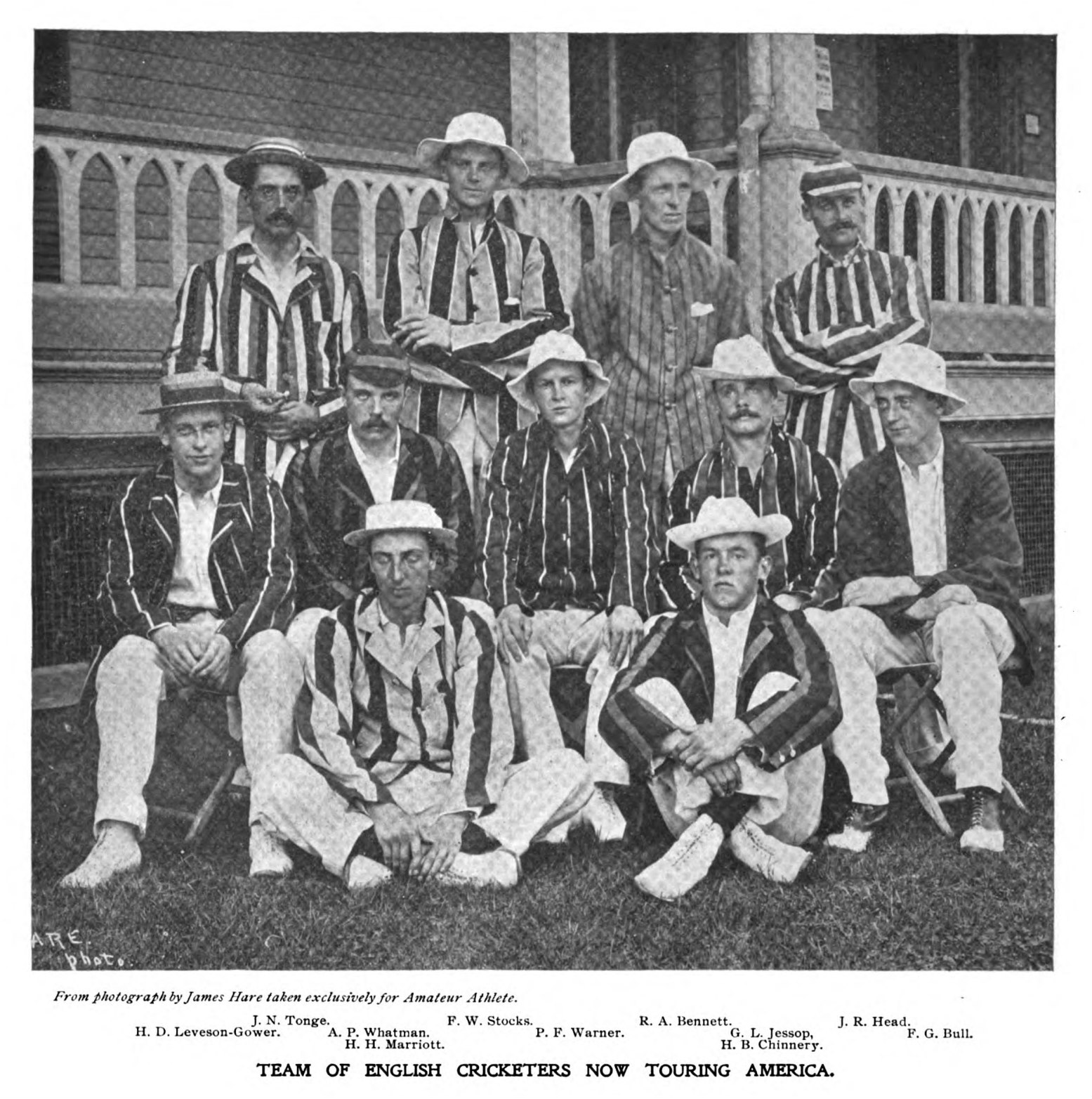
Chinnery, sitting right in front row, on North American tour in 1897.

Harry Broderick Chinnery (6 February 1876 – 28 May 1916) was an English cricketer. He played 66 first-class matches for Middlesex and Surrey between 1897 and 1910. He was killed in action during World War I.

== Family and personal life ==
He was the son of the athlete and City stockbroker, Walter Moresby Chinnery of Hatchford Park, Cobham, and his first wife Mary Chinnery (née Dixon). He was educated at Eton and became a partner in Chinnery Bros., the stockbroking company established by his father and his father's brother.

His half-brother, Esmé Chinnery, who was also a first-class cricketer, was a son of his father's second wife Alice Emily Chinnery (née Wilson).

== See also ==
- List of Surrey County Cricket Club players
- List of cricketers who were killed during military service
