= Billy Keane =

Irish hurler

Personal information
- Native name: Liam Ó Catháin (Irish)
- Born: Banagher, County Offaly, Ireland

Sport
- Sport: Hurling
- Position: Left corner-back
Club
- Years: Club
- St Rynagh's
Club titles
- Leinster titles: 1
Inter-county*
Years	County	Apps (scores)
1984	Offaly	0 (0-00)
Inter-county titles
- Leinster titles: 0
- All-Irelands: 0
- NHL: 0
- All Stars: 0
- *Inter County team apps and scores correct as of 20:06, 30 June 2014.

William Keane is an Irish former hurler who played as a left corner-back for the Offaly senior team.

Born in Banagher, County Offaly, Keane first played competitive hurling in his youth. He made his senior debut with Offaly during the 1984–85 National Hurling League, but was dropped from the team before the championship. During his brief career he experienced little success.

At club level Keane is a one-time Leinster medallist with St Rynagh's. He also won numerous championship medals with the club.

== Honours ==
St Rynagh's

- Leinster Senior Club Hurling Championship (1): 1982
