= Hatchford =

Hamlet in Surrey, England

Coordinates: 51.307653°N 0.427281°W

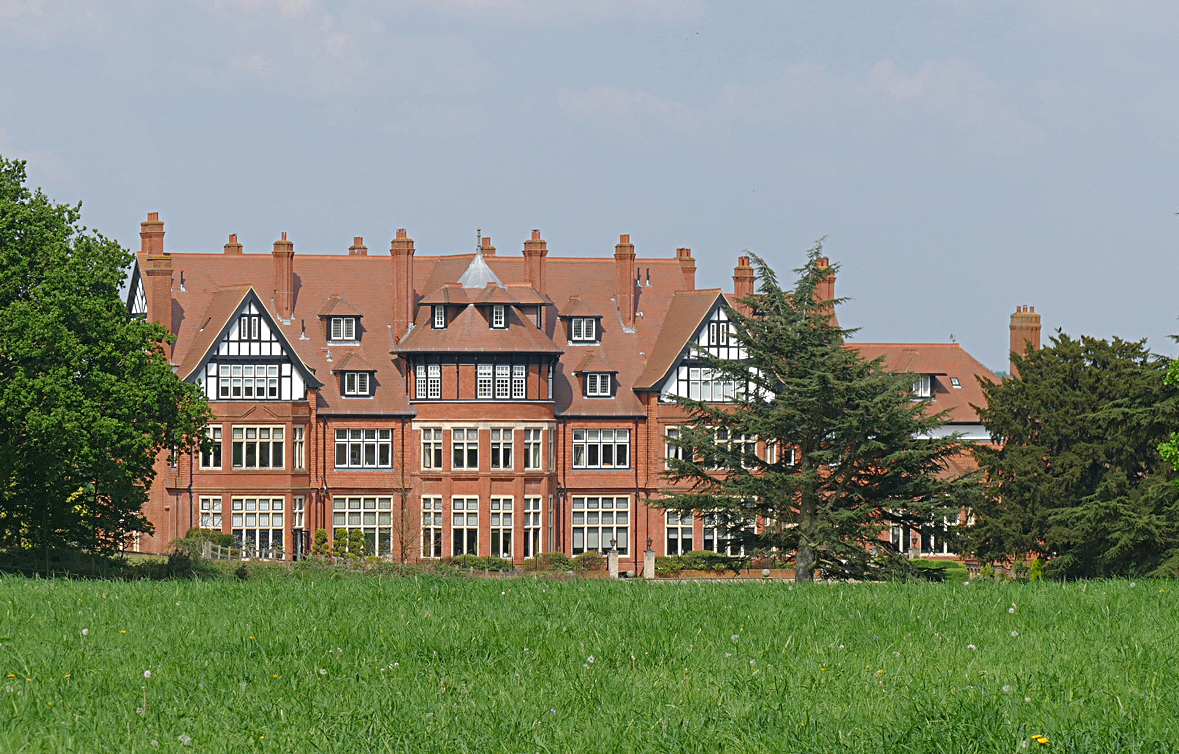
- Hatchford Park house

- Location within Surrey
- OS grid reference: TQ109581
- District: Elmbridge
- Shire county: Surrey
- Region: South East
- Country: England
- Sovereign state: United Kingdom
- Post town: Cobham
- Postcode district: KT11
- Dialling code: 01932
- Police: Surrey
- Fire: Surrey
- Ambulance: South East Coast
- UK Parliament: Esher and Walton

Hatchford is a hamlet in the English county of Surrey outside the town of Cobham (its former civil and ecclesiastical parish); it traditionally includes the contiguous hamlet of Pointers Green.

== Geography ==
Hatchford rests almost wholly on the high Bagshot Formation (above the flood plain of the River Mole), on a country road between Cobham, Martyrs Green, Ockham and Downside. The hamlet is bisected into Pointers Green main sub-localities by the M25 motorway.

== Etymology ==
The name of the hamlet appears to have changed over time. A deed dating from 1740 refers to a John Wilson of 'Hatchfold'. It also appears on Rocque's Map of Surrey of 1765 and Cary's 1786 map as 'Hatch Fold'. It was still 'Hatchfold' in the Ordnance Survey map of 1816. However, by the time of Brayley's 1848 Topological History, it had become 'Hatchford'. Early maps and references to the area relate principally to the historic house that is now called 'Hatchford Park', but which was at earlier times referred to simply as 'Hatchford'. As the hamlet grew in the late nineteenth century, however, the name was applied more broadly, with the historic house taking the name 'Hatchford Park' to distinguish it.

== History ==
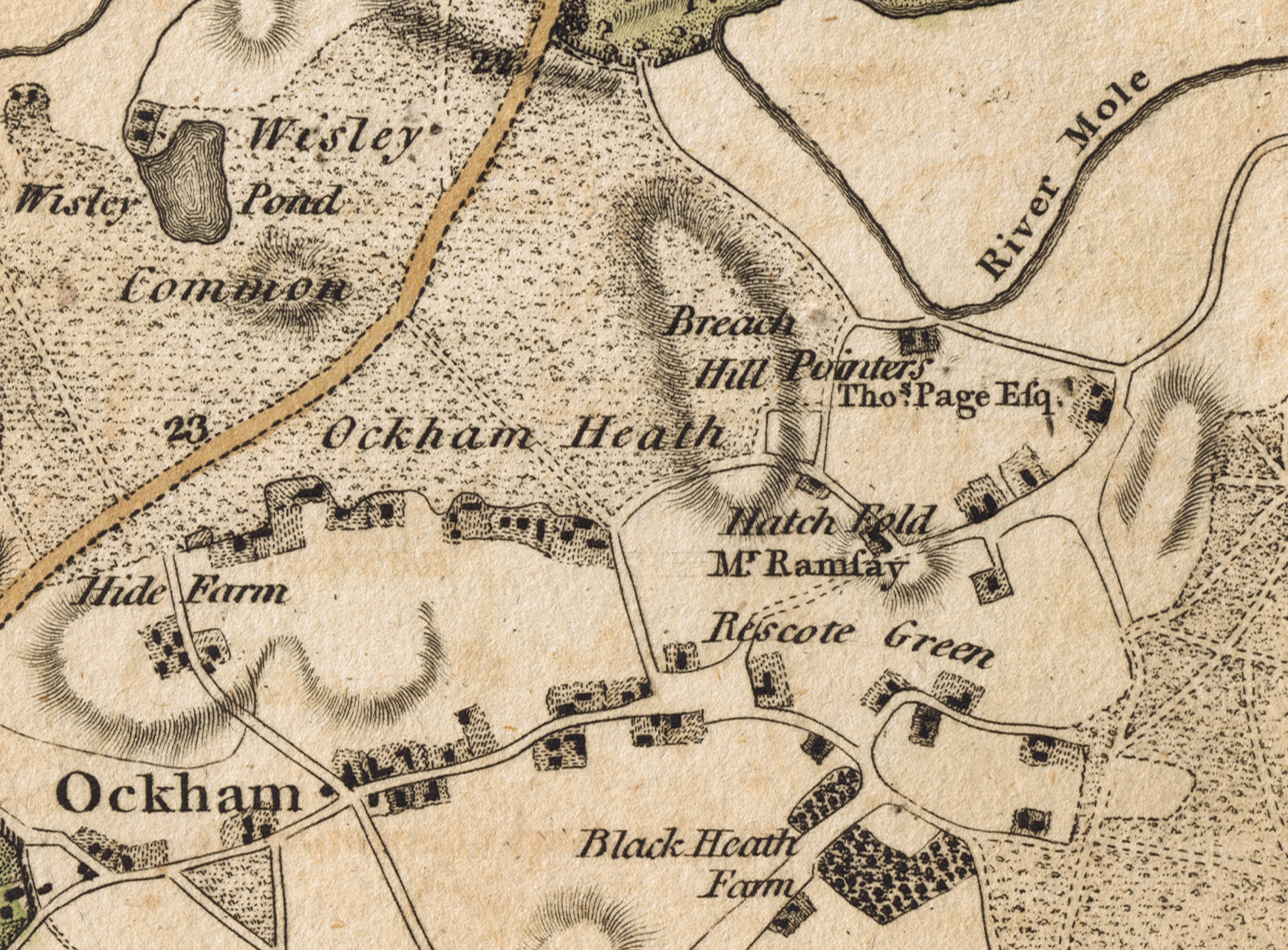
1786 Map of Hatchford and surrounding area

The house at Hatchford Park was originally built in the 1600s, but little physical evidence of this survives. In the eighteenth century, it belonged for a time to Andrew Ramsay, a wealthy landowner and Acting Governor of Bombay for a period. In the nineteenth century, it became the home of Francis Egerton, 1st Earl of Ellesmere, who rebuilt the house in the 1850s. Lord Ellesmere started an arboretum in the grounds in 1845, while Lady Ellesmere laid out the gardens. The garden writer William Keane included the gardens in his book The Beauties of Surrey. Lady Ellesmere lived on at Hatchford Park after the 1857 death of the 1st Earl. Her mother, Lady Charlotte Greville (née Cavendish-Bentinck) died at Hatchford Park on 28 July 1862, aged 86. The estate was later purchased by Isabella Saltonstall, a patron and executor of the painter George Stubbs. The main house was remodelled in c1890 by Rowland Plumbe in mock Jacobean style for its then owner, the City stockbroker, Walter Moresby Chinnery. It then became the home of Bernhard Samuelson MP, who built a mausoleum in the grounds. Its last private owner as a single house was the steel magnate William John Firth, who lived there in the 1930s.

During World War I, Hatchford Park was used as a military hospital. In World War II, Hatchford Park was taken over by the War Office, as were some other properties in the area. In 1952, it became Hatchford Park School, a residential school for children with disabilities. In 1969 it was used as a filming location for Spearhead from Space an episode of Doctor Who broadcast in 1970. In the 1990s, Hatchford Park was bought by property developers for conversion into private apartments. During the redevelopment, a fire was started which severely damaged the manor house and destroyed many of the original features.

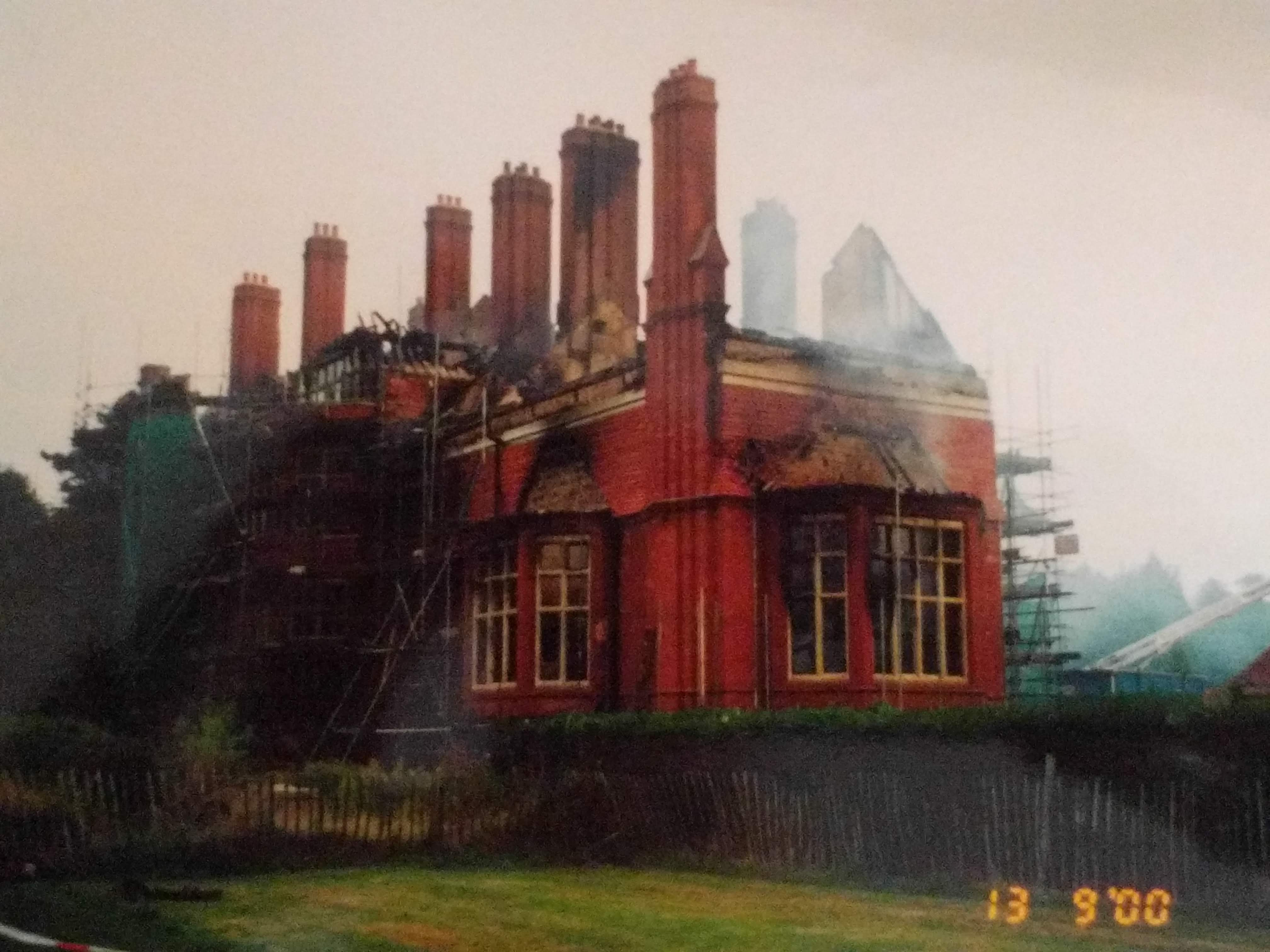
Hatchford Park immediately after the severe fire that was started during renovations

At the same time as remodelling the main house, Lord Ellesmere also gave land and funds to build a small church, St. Matthews, on his estate. In 1865, the church was endowed as a parish within the Diocese of Winchester with the Earl of Ellesmere as patron. However, the church was demolished in the 1960s due to disrepair, leaving only the graveyard, which remains in use; the community is now served by parish church of Ockham (All Saints') and the small chapel of St. Matthew in Downside.

Hatchford End, built near Hatchford Park in 1752, was given to house the estate chaplain. In the 1920s, the 4th Earl bought Hatchford End as a home for his three unmarried sisters (Lady Blanche Egerton, Lady Dorothy and Lady Christian).

Another major historic house of the hamlet is Pointers (also Poynters), which was known as 'Pointintone' in 675. This house overlooking the River Mole was an important house for many years, being the residence of Thomas Page, who purchased both this estate and the manor of Cobham in the year 1781, under the option of his father's will, and substantially enlarged the manor via the Enclosures Act. Page also diverted the nearby road (Pointers road) so that it passed to the south of the house, rather than between the house and river Mole. As the manor house of Cobham it was "several times visited here by the late duke of York, and other members of the royal family". It has since been divided into multiple dwellings. Also dating from the 1600s is Cold Norton (formerly known as Burchets).

== Other landmarks ==
Near Hatchford Park are several dwellings which were originally established as almshouses.

On the hill north of Hatchford (known as Chatley Heath, formerly Breach Hill) stands a semaphore tower, which was part of the line of Naval communication semaphore line from the south coast to London, prior to the development of the electric telegraph.

Where the M25 motorway cuts through the hamlet is Brickfield copse, named after early brickworks and claypits located there. A pest house, for victims of smallpox and other contagious diseases, was also established there, near the sixteenth century Pointers Farm Cottage, some time before 1711. The site was shown in a 1796 map as including a hop garden and orchard.

A Roman villa is known to have existed to the north of Hatchford, near Chatley Farm, which has been dated to about 350AD. There is a (relatively uncommon) bronze-age bell barrow on nearby Cockcrow Hill.
