= Ernest Chinnery =

Australian anthropologist

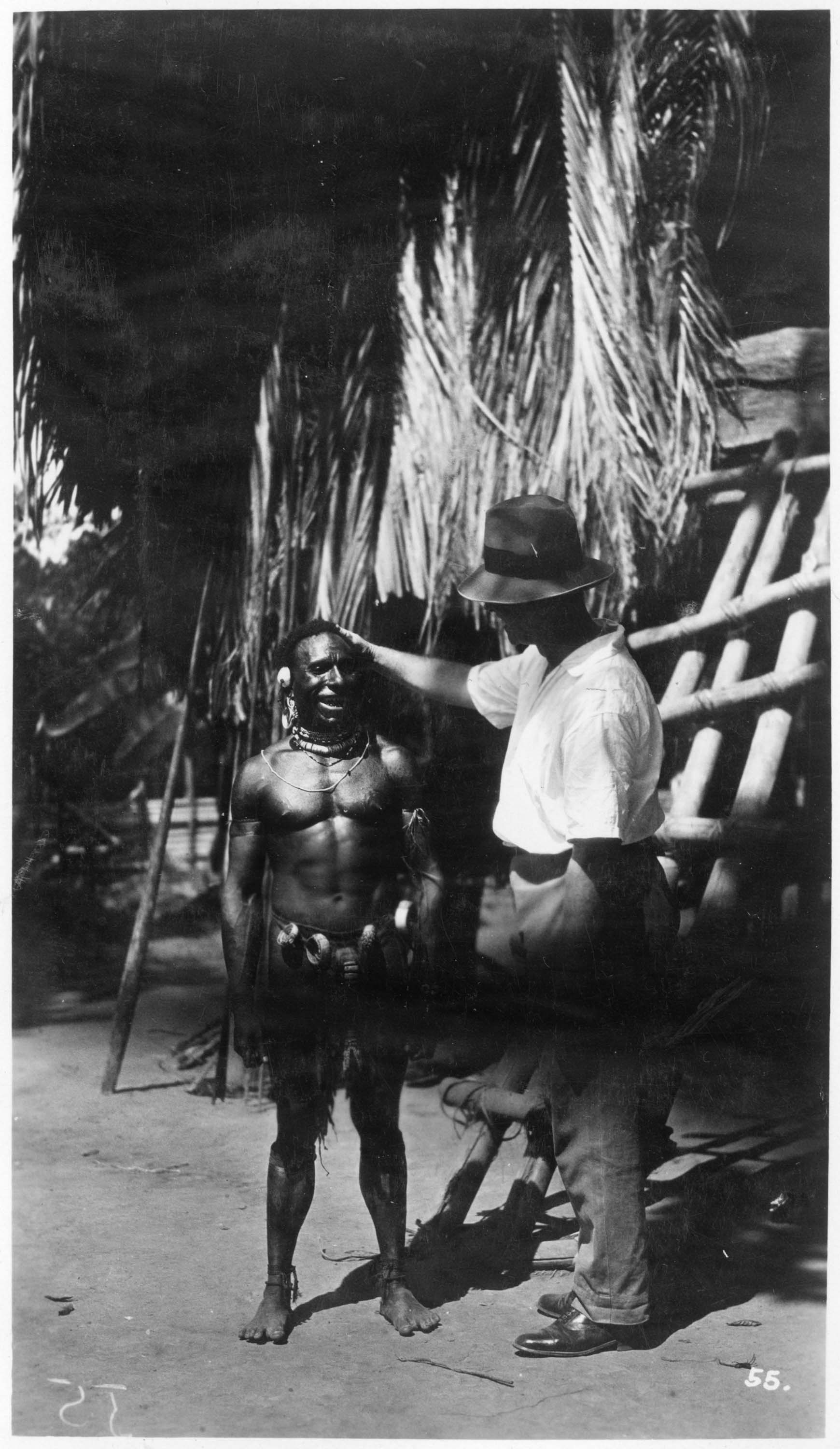
- Australian anthropologist Ernest Chinnery at work in the middle Sepik, 1920s
- Born: Ernest William Pearson Chinnery; 5 November 1887; Waterloo, Victoria, Australia
- Died: 17 December 1972 (aged 85); Prahran, Victoria, Australia
- Other names: Chin
- Occupation: Anthropologist
- Spouse: Sarah Chinnery (m. 1919; died 1970)

Ernest William Pearson Chinnery (5 November 1887 – 17 December 1972) was an Australian anthropologist, ethnographer, and public servant. He worked as a senior colonial official and held many appointments throughout his career, such as Government Anthropologist in the Territory of Papua and Director of the Northern Territory Department of Native Affairs. He worked extensively in Papua New Guinea and visited communities along the Sepik river.

== Early life ==
Ernest Chinnery was born on 5 November 1887 in Waterloo, Victoria, to John William Chinnery, a miner, and Grace Newton (née Pearson).

== Career ==
Ernest Chinnery began working in public service administration in the Australian territory of Papua at the age of 22. After a year as a clerk he was appointed to be a patrol officer in lands yet unexplored by the Australian settlers. In 1917, he entered the Australian Flying Corps and served as Lieutenant, Air Mechanic 2nd Class, in World War I. After Chinnery was demobilized in England he attended University of Cambridge, where he was mentored by Alfred Cort Haddon, and obtained a degree in anthropology in 1919.

Chinnery returned to Papua in 1921 as a native labor supervisor in the mines at New Guinea Copper. During this time he appealed to the Australian government to fund anthropological and ethnographic study of the Papuan people. This was part of an ongoing debate during the interwar period about the efficacy of anthropology and ethnography in governance and assimilation of Native peoples. As a result of these debates, the position of Government Anthropologist was created, and Chinnery assumed the position in April of 1924.

As Government Anthropologist, Chinnery was sent on fieldwork missions to "uncontrolled" and "uncivilized" areas to study their societies and attempt to establish amicable relationships between the Australian settlers and native Papuans. Chinnery is known for spearheading the effort to train cadets and officers in anthropology and ethnography at the University of Sydney to learn how to study the culture they sought to supersede. He advocated for the application of anthropology to colonial governance and was a proponent of the function of the anthropologist as a mediator of cultural conflict as the Australian government pushed for control over the Territory of Papua.

In 1932, Chinnery was promoted to Director of District Services alongside his Government Anthropologist appointment. He used this opportunity to conduct more surveys of Papua's indigenous population to extend control. By 1939, Chinnery was appointed Director of the Native Affairs Branch in the Northern Territory administration. He retired to Melbourne in 1947.

== Personal life ==
Ernest Chinnery married Sarah Johnston Chinnery (née Neill), a photographer, in 1919. Together, they had four daughters: Sheila, Patricia, Prudence, and Mary. Chinnery died in Pahran on 17 December 1972.

== Bibliography and sources ==
- Chinnery Papers (Australian National Library)
- E. J. B. Foxcroft, Australian Native Policy (Melb, 1941)
- C. D. Rowley, The Destruction of Aboriginal Society (Canb, 1970);
- Northern Territory, Annual Report, 1938–39; New Guinea, Report on the Administration of the Territory, 1938–39;
- Government Gazette (Commonwealth), 14 Sept 1939
- D. J. F. Griffiths, The Career of F. E. Williams, Government Anthropologist of Papua, 1922–1943 (M.A. thesis, Australian National University, 1977)
- Gilbert Murray papers (National Library of Australia); A56, A73, A452 59/6066, 6067, A518 C828/2 (National Archives of Australia).
