= Sarah Chinnery =

British-Australian photographer and diarist

- Born: Sarah Johnston Neill; 30 January 1887; Belfast, Ireland
- Died: 24 March 1970 (aged 83); Sandringham, Victoria, Australia
- Occupation: Photographer
- Years active: c. 1901–1933
- Spouse: Ernest Chinnery (m. 1919–1970)
- Children: Four daughters

Sarah Johnston Chinnery (née Neill; 1887 – 1970) was a British-Australian photographer and diarist, known for her photographs and diaries of sixteen years in the Territory of Papua New Guinea during the 1920s and 30s.

== Early life ==
Born Sarah Johnston Neill in Belfast, Ireland, she moved to the town of Aylesbury in Buckinghamshire, England at the age of 13, where her older brothers operated a dental surgery. Her interest in photography began when one of her brothers gave her a "Little Nipper" camera. Originally employed to "keep house" in her brothers' surgery, Neill qualified as a dentist herself and replaced her brother Bob in the practice when he left to serve in the army during the First World War.

Many of her dental patients at the time were from the large army camp nearby, and in 1918, she met Ernest Chinnery (known as Pearson Chinnery or "Chin")–an Australian observer lieutenant in the Royal Flying Corps. They married in April 1919, and lived in Cambridge where Pearson Chinnery studied and lectured in anthropology at Cambridge University.

== New Guinea ==
Pearson received a grant from the Royal Geographical Society in 1920, and the couple moved to Melbourne, Australia later that year while they considered moving to New Guinea where Pearson had previously served as a magistrate. He moved there later in the year as director of native labour for New Guinea Copper Mines, with Sarah joining him in Port Moresby in 1921. In 1924, Pearson was appointed government anthropologist of the Territory of New Guinea, and they moved to Rabaul.

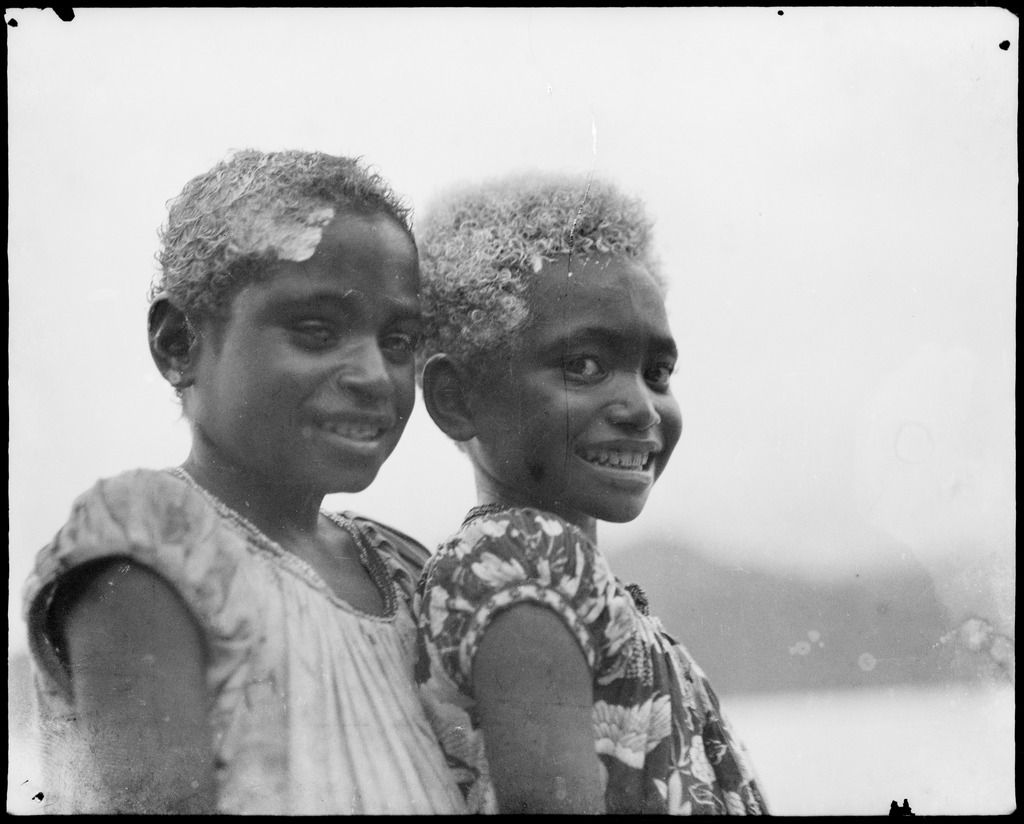
One of Chinnery's photographs from New Guinea

The Chinnerys spent sixteen years in New Guinea, where Sarah regularly took solo trips around the territory to take photographs of the landscape and the indigenous people. Unlike most ethnographic photography of the time, Chinnery's photographs were not staged and were respectful depictions of local residents in their daily lives. Chinnery did not exhibit her work during her lifetime, but her photographs were published in several of Australia's major newspapers, along with articles and anecdotes written by her. In March 1935, she produced a three-page article and photo spread for the weekend magazine of The New York Times.

In addition to her photographic work, Chinnery kept extensive diaries of her time in New Guinea and Papua. She began to rewrite her diaries as a book in the mid-1930s, but abandoned this work after the 1937 volcanic eruption in Rabaul, after which she returned to Australia. Her manuscripts were typed up by her four daughters and donated to the National Library of Australia, which published them in 1998 as Malaguna Road: The Papua and New Guinea Diaries of Sarah Chinnery, edited by Kate Fortune.

== Later life ==
Chinnery died at Sandringham Hospital in Melbourne on 24 March 1970, aged 83. She was survived by her husband (who died in 1972), and their four daughters.
