= Jacob's Ladder (Perth) =

Outdoor stairway in Perth, Western Australia

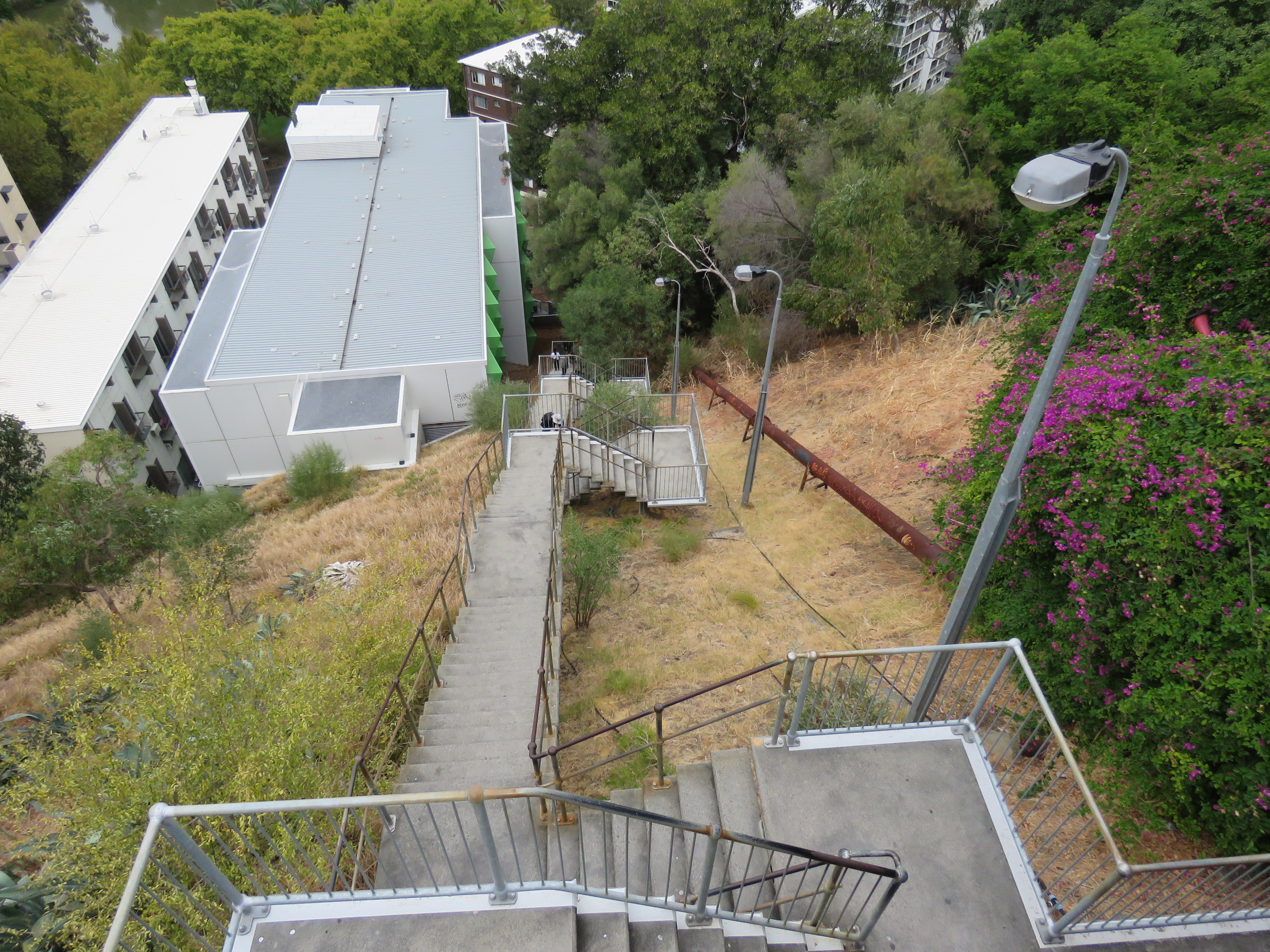
View of Jacob's Ladder from the top

Jacob's Ladder is an outdoor stairway in Perth, Western Australia. Consisting of 242 concrete steps, the stairway links the north-east corner of King's Park with the Swan River, though it is not part of Kings Park itself. Beginning at the top end of Cliff Street and leading down to Mounts Bay Road, Jacob's Ladder is a popular site for Perth residents to exercise.

== History ==
Originally known as Cliff Street Stairway, it was constructed in 1909 as a straight stairway of 274 jarrah steps as a cheaper alternative to building a road for Mount Eliza residents to reach the river. According to legend, it acquired its current name from a local real estate agent who placed a sign at the base of the stairway, in reference to both the Bible story about a ladder to heaven and the stunning views at the top of the structure. The original wooden structure was closed and demolished in 1961 due to safety concerns and replaced by the winding concrete stairway still in use today.

According to legend, Herb Elliott trained on the original timber version of Jacob's Ladder before it was replaced by its current concrete and metal version.

== Incidents ==
The stairway was closed for three months after being damaged by a landslide during a storm on 22 March 2010. It re-opened on 21 June 2010, after repairs.

In November 2023, the stairway was closed for three weeks after a deliberately-lit bushfire caused some minor structural damage.

The stairway's enduring popularity with joggers has led to complaints from some nearby residents over noise and inconsiderate behaviour.
