= Edward Hawtrey (sportsman) =

English cricketer and schoolmaster

Personal information
- Born: 10 October 1847 Windsor, Berkshire, England
- Died: 14 August 1916 (aged 68) Westgate-on-Sea, Kent, England

Sport
- Sport: Athletics / Cricket
- Event: 1 mile
- Club: Eton College

Edward Hawtrey
Domestic team information
- Years: Team
- 1880–1882: Marylebone Cricket Club

Career statistics
Competition	First-class
Matches	2
Runs scored	1
Batting average	0.25
100s/50s	–/–
Top score	1
Balls bowled	96
Wickets	2
Bowling average	32.00
5 wickets in innings	–
10 wickets in match	–
Best bowling	2/50
Catches/stumpings	1/–
- Source: Cricinfo, 5 June 2021

Edward Montague Hawtrey (10 October 1847 – 14 August 1916) was an English first-class cricketer and schoolmaster.

== Biography ==
The son of The Reverend John Hawtrey, he was born at Windsor in October 1847. He was educated at Eton College, before going up to St John's College, Cambridge.

He was active in athletics while at Eton and Cambridge and won the silver medal in the 1 mile event at the 1868 AAC Championships, the silver medal in the 4 miles event at the 1869 AAC Championships and 1870 AAC Championships.

He was a member of the Cambridge University Athletics Club, for which he served a president in 1872. Hawtrey competed in the 3 mile race university race in 1872, in which he finished in a dead heat in 15 minutes 44 seconds with Oxford's Robin Benson. He gained athletics blues in 1870, 1871 and 1872.

After graduating from Cambridge he became the headmaster of Hawtreys in 1873 (which had been founded by his father in 1869), overseeing the schools move to Westgate-on-Sea in 1883. He later played first-class cricket for the Marylebone Cricket Club, making two appearances against Hampshire in 1880 and Somerset in 1882. He struggled as a batsman, scoring just one run across four innings', while as a bowler he took 2 wickets. Hawtrey was headmaster at Hawtreys until his death at Westgate in August 1916. His brother was the footballer and FA Cup winner John Hawtrey, while his youngest brother was the actor Charles Hawtrey.
