= Waterloo, Victoria =

Waterloo
- Town
- Coordinates: 37°22′21″S 143°24′52″E
- Country: Australia
- State: Victoria
- LGA: Pyrenees Shire
- Location: 162 km (101 mi) WNW of Melbourne; 50 km (31 mi) WNW of Ballarat; 9 km (5.6 mi) N of Beaufort, Victoria

Government
  - State electorate: Ripon
  - Federal division: Wannon

Population
  - Total: 1102016 census
- Postcode: 3373

Waterloo is a locality in Pyrenees Shire approximately 9 kilometres (5.6 mi) north of the town of Beaufort, Victoria and 162 kilometres (101 mi) west north west of the state capital of Melbourne.

It was originally settled during the Victorian gold rush as part of the Baxter lead alluvial Gold Mining Precinct. There were a number of company mines as well as individual miners with licenses. A school was built on top of the hill overlooking Waterloo Flats. There was also the Waterloo Post Office opening on 1 November 1860 and closing in 1965.

Following the gold rush, Waterloo became a settled defined township with stores, a primary school, hotels and a public hall. All have now closed/disappeared leaving behind a collection of houses and farms where a bigger town once stood. Today there are 110 people in the area living on farms that were once part of the Waterloo township. The community is supported by the Waterloo Community Group and the committee of management of the Waterloo Hall and Recreation Reserve Committee.

The locality is the birthplace of Ernest Chinnery (5 November 1887- 17 December 1972), an Australian anthropologist and public servant who worked extensively in Papua New Guinea and visited communities along the Sepik river.

During World War I many men from Waterloo served in the 57th Battalion, 2nd Reinforcement of the Australian Army.

The Waterloo Community Cup is a series of equestrian endurance rides based at the Waterloo Recreation Grounds.
