= William B. Keene =

American judge

- Born: William Bigby Keene; February 23, 1925; Youngstown, Ohio, U.S.
- Died: January 10, 2018 (aged 92); Manhattan Beach, California, U.S.
- Occupation: Television judge
- Spouse: Patricia Margaret Danskin (m.1947-2015; her death)
- Children: 2

William Bigby Keene (February 23, 1925 – January 10, 2018) was an American attorney, and a Los Angeles County Superior Court judge from 1965 to 1984. He is perhaps best known for his role as judge in the TV show Divorce Court, a dramatized re-enactment of actual divorce cases. He also appeared as Judge Herman Keene in the episode "Whistle Stop" in the legal drama L.A. Law.

William Bigby Keene was born on February 23, 1925, in Youngstown, Ohio, the son of James and Effie Keene. During his judicial career he was originally assigned to the trial of Charles Manson but was later replaced after Manson filed an affidavit of prejudice. He later presided over the trial of serial killer William Bonin and sentenced him to death (Bonin was executed in 1996). Keene graduated from the UCLA School of Law in 1952, where he was a member of the first graduating class. A 1986 People magazine profile of Keene mentioned that during his college years he was friends with Watergate figures H. R. Haldeman and John Ehrlichman. He was in private practice of law for 11 years and was a deputy district attorney before being appointed to the municipal bench in 1963. During his judicial career he was a co-founder of the International Academy of Trial Judges.

Keene was married to Patricia Margaret Danskin from 1947 to 2015, when she died of cancer. They had two children: Andy Keene and Kerry Keene Padilla and six grandchildren. Keene died on January 10, 2018, at the age of 92
