= William Keane (author) =

English gardener & writer

William Keane was a 19th-century English gardener and garden writer, whose descriptions of important gardens in Surrey and Middlesex remain a source of historical reference.

Keane was the gardener at Orwell Park, Ipswich, and a contributor to the Journal of Horticulture. He wrote five gardening books, first published between 1849 and 1861.

His first work was The Beauties of Surrey, published in 1849, described as being "a particular description of about one hundred and twenty seats of the nobility and gentry, in the County of Surrey, comprising all that is interesting in the departments of horticulture, floriculture, arboriculture, park and pleasure ground scenery, from visits made in the spring of 1849".

Keane called his book a "labour of love". He had spent the first part of 1849 visiting gardens at country houses in Surrey, and decided to write up the results for others to enjoy: "Now that railroads, the annihilators of space and time, afford such facilities for visiting various and distant places in the country, it is assuredly an advantage to be provided with a description of the different Seats, to select that neighbourhood where the particular information that each person may choose to seek would be best found. If it were necessary it would be easy to describe the many useful purposes that such visits would secure, either for a knowledge of the improved system of plant cultivation, park and pleasure ground scenery, fruit or flower forcing, flower garden embellishment, fruit tree and vegetable garden management, the best horticultural structures, pinetums, in short, every improvement that would be interesting to gardeners in particular, or to the public in general."

In 1850, he published the sequel, The Beauties of Middlesex: Being a Particular Description of the Principal Seats of the Nobility and Gentry, in the County of Middlesex Comprising a Great Deal that is Interesting in the History Architecture and Internal Adornments of the Mansions Etc., and in the Gardens, Parks, and Pleasure Ground Scenery, from Visits Made in 1849 and 1850.

Keane then moved on to writing practical gardening manuals. He published Out-door gardening during every week in the year: shewing how, when, and where to sow, plant, and cultivate all crops in the kitchen, fruit and flower garden in 1859, and In-door gardening for every week in the year: showing the most successful treatment for all plants cultivated in the greenhouse, conservatory, stove, pit, orchid and forcing-house in 1860.

In 1861, he published his final work, The Young Gardener's Educator, described as being "a series of lessons, in the conversational style, on subjects generally considered necessary for the young gardener to understand, viz.: English grammar, geology, botany, vegetable physiology, horticultural chemistry, physical geography, entomology, land measuring, architectural drawing, letter writing, penmanship, the measurement of artificer’s work connected with gardening, etc". Keane wrote the book as a series of conversations between three characters, the head gardener "Mr B", the foreman "John", and a garden worker known as "the journeyman", with Mr B’s son. At the time of publication, Keane was based at The Old Horticultural Gardens, Edwardes Place, Kensington.

Keane's guides to the gardens of Surrey and Middlesex are still used as a reference by organisations such as the London Friends of Parks and Gardens Trust.
