= 23rd (County of London) Battalion, London Regiment =

7th Surrey Rifle Volunteers 4th Volunteer Bn, East Surrey Regiment 23rd Bn, London Regiment 7th (23rd London) Bn, East Surrey Regiment 42nd Royal Tank Regiment
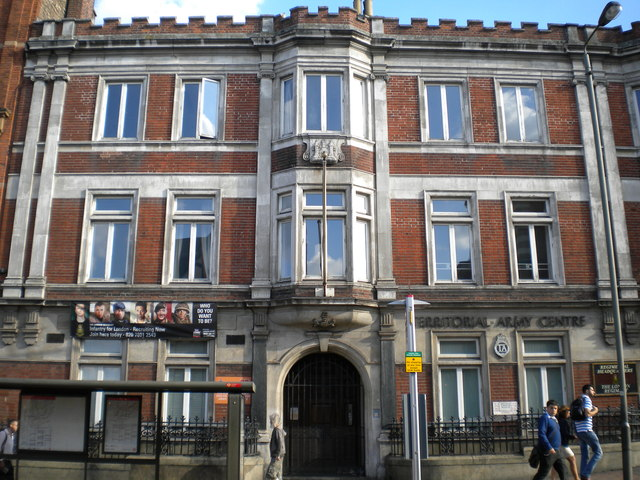
- Headquarters of the 23rd London Regiment, built in 1887
- Active: 30 November 1859–1 May 1961
- Country: United Kingdom
- Branch: Volunteer Force/Territorial Force/Territorial Army
- Type: Infantry Battalion; Tank Regiment
- Role: Infantry, Armoured
- Size: 1–3 Battalions
- Part of: Surrey Brigade; 47th (2nd London) Division
- Garrison/HQ: St John's Hill drill hall, St.John's Hill, London
- Nickname: 'Kennington Guards'
- Mottos: Tuebor ('I will protect') 'Loyalty Unites Us'
- Engagements: Second Boer War; World War I: Western Front; Salonika; Palestine; World War II: Western Desert; Alamein; Tunisia; Italy; North West Europe

Commanders
- Notable commanders: Col Francis Marcus Beresford

The 23rd (County of London) Battalion, London Regiment was an auxiliary unit of the British Army. Formed in 1908 from Volunteer units in the Surrey suburbs of London that dated back to 1859, it was part of the London Regiment in the Territorial Force (TF). Its battalions served on the Western Front, at Salonika and in Palestine during World War I. When the London Regiment was abolished the unit reverted to the East Surrey Regiment but just before World War II it was converted to armour as two battalion of the Royal Tank Regiment. In this role it fought in North Africa, including the Battle of Alamein, and in Italy and North West Europe. Postwar it reverted to infantry in 1956 and later was amalgamated with other Surrey battalions into the Queen's Regiment. Its successors continue in today's London Guards.

== Volunteer Force ==
The invasion scare of 1859 led to the creation of the Volunteer Force and huge enthusiasm for joining Rifle Volunteer Corps (RVCs). Among the RVCs raised in the county of Surrey at this time was the 7th Surrey or Southwark Rifle Volunteers recruited from Southwark in South London. It was formed on 30 November under the command of Captain Francis Marcus Beresford. The new corps obtained permission to use Bermondsey Grammar School as its depot, and to carry out live firing practice on Plumstead Marshes. By February 1860 it had six companies, and Captain-Commandant Beresford was promoted to Major-Commandant.

A second RVC was raised in Southwark on 9 March 1861, by George Cruikshank the cartoonist and vice-president of the National Temperance League. Numbered 24th it was known as 'Havelock's Own' after the hero of the Indian Mutiny Maj-Gen Sir Henry Havelock, a noted leader of the Temperance movement. Cruikshank intended his unit to be formed solely from sober artisans, but sufficient numbers were not forthcoming and he received little support from the Earl of Lovelace, the Lord Lieutenant of Surrey. When he sent a recruiting party into neighbouring Deptford, Cruikshank not only ran into opposition from the Peace Society, but he was rebuked by the Lord Lieutenant of Kent for recruiting across the Surrey border. There were moves to merge the weak unit into the 7th Surreys, with whom relations were not good. Cruikshank gave up in disgust, disbanded his corps in March 1862 and moved his efforts to Middlesex, where he succeeded in forming the 48th Middlesex (Havelock's Temperance Volunteers).

The Earl of Lovelace, himself a Militia officer, was reluctant to support the volunteers, and insisted that only ex-Regular officers should be appointed to the rank of Lieutenant-Colonel. Nevertheless, Beresford was promoted to Lt-Col of the 7th Surrey RVC on 19 November 1864.

Under the 'Localisation of the Forces' scheme introduced by the Cardwell Reforms of 1872, Volunteers were grouped into county brigades with their local Regular and Militia battalions – Sub-District No 47 (County of Surrey) for the 7th Surrey RVC, grouped with the 31st (Huntingdonshire) and 70th (Surrey) Regiments of Foot.

By the 1870s some of the enthusiasm for volunteering had waned, and numbers fell. The 7th Surrey RVC lost the lease of its drill ground, and a number of officers resigned. Lieutenant-Col Beresford, by now Member of Parliament for Southwark, retired from the command and was appointed the unit's first Honorary Colonel on 25 January 1873. The last new Surrey RVC to be formed was the 26th at Shaftesbury Park, Lavender Hill, Clapham, on 28 April 1875. It soon had four companies enrolled.

Volunteer corps were consolidated into larger units in 1880, when the 26th Surreys was absorbed into the 7th Surreys, giving the battalion 10 companies (six at Southwark and four at Clapham).

The Childers Reforms of 1881 took Cardwell's reforms further, and the Volunteers were formally affiliated to their local Regular regiment, the 7th Surrey RVC becoming a Volunteer Battalion of the new East Surrey Regiment, formed from the old 31st and 70th Foot. The 7th Surrey RVC changed its designation to '4th Volunteer Battalion, East Surrey Regiment; on 1 December 1887. Right Half Battalion was based in spacious premises at 71 Upper Kennington Lane, Left Half Battalion in poor accommodation on St John's Hill in Clapham Junction.

While the sub-districts were later referred to as 'brigades', they were purely administrative organisations and the Volunteers were excluded from the 'mobilisation' part of the Cardwell system. The Stanhope Memorandum of December 1888 proposed a more comprehensive Mobilisation Scheme for Volunteer units, which would assemble in their own brigades at key points in case of war. In peacetime these brigades provided a structure for collective training. Under this scheme the Volunteer Battalions of the Queen's Royal Regiment (West Surrey) and the East Surreys formed the Surrey Brigade. The brigade initially shared the Kennington headquarters of the 4th VB, East Surreys, and its assembly point was at Caterham Barracks, the Brigade of Guards' depot conveniently situated for the London Defence Positions along the North Downs.

On 25 May 1889 the Rev Edward Talbot was appointed the battalion's Chaplain; while holding the position he became Bishop of Rochester and later Bishop of Southwark. The 4th VB's CO, Lt-Col Arthur Bowen, was closely associated with the cadet movement in South London, and the 1st Cadet Battalion, East Surrey Regiment, of four companies existed at 71 Kennington Lane between 1890 and 1896. By 1901 the battalion had moved to a new HQ Drill Hall at 27 St John's Hill, Clapham Junction, on land provided by the Hon Colonel, Lord Wandsworth. Saturday afternoon drills were held on Wimbledon Common, although the crowds of spectators made it difficult to carry out even simple manoeuvres.

=== Second Boer War ===
After Black Week in December 1899, the Volunteers were invited to send active service units to assist the Regulars in the Second Boer War. The War Office decided that one company 116 strong could be recruited from the volunteer battalions of any infantry regiment that had a regular battalion serving in South Africa. The 4th VB raised the East Surrey Volunteer Service Company, which sailed in March 1900 under the command of Capt George Collyer and saw service with 2nd Bn East Surreys as 'I Company'. It took part in the operations to clear the Biggarsberg, and in the actions at Inkweloane and at Almond's Nek, where the Boers were turned out of a strong position. In the last six months of its service from October 1900 to May 1901, the company was in a fortified position at Van Reenen's Pass at the junction of the Natal and Orange Free State Railways. The company returned to the East Surrey's depot at Kingston upon Thames in June 1901.

In addition the 4th VB supplied volunteers to the Regular Army, the City Imperial Volunteers, and to the Sharpshooters and other units of the Imperial Yeomanry. In total, 13 officers and 235 other ranks (ORs) of the battalion served in the war and earned its first Battle honour: South Africa 1900–02.

In the reorganisation after the end of the Boer War in 1902, the large Surrey Brigade was split into separate East and West Surrey Brigades, under command of the respective regimental districts.

== Territorial Force ==
Under the Haldane Reforms of 1908 the Volunteers were subsumed into the new Territorial Force (TF), administered by county Territorial Associations. The volunteers in rural Surrey came under the Surrey Territorial Association; however, because many of the North Surrey suburban parishes had been included in the new County of London since 1889, the battalions recruited in South London were included in a new all-TF London Regiment under the County of London TA. Consequently, the 4th VB East Surreys became 23rd (County of London) Battalion, London Regiment.

The four former Surrey battalions of the London Regiment (now 21st–24th Londons) comprised the 6th London Brigade in the TF's 2nd London Division.

The St Thomas's (Wandsworth) Cadet Corps was affiliated to the battalion.

== World War I ==
The 23rd Londons remained in training between the outbreak of the World War I until on 15 March it landed at Le Havre as part of 6th London Brigade, 2nd London Division, which that May was renumbered 142nd Brigade in 47th (2nd London) Division. As such it fought in the Battle of Loos and Battle of the Somme before spending the last three months of 1916 on the Ypres Salient. In 1917 the battalion was involved in the battles of Messines Ridge and the Bourlon Wood. It also faced the German Spring Offensive of 1918 as well as taking part in the Hundred Days Offensive and the liberation of Lille, before ending the war at Frasnes.

=== 2nd and 3rd Battalions ===
After the outbreak of wr a 2/23rd Battalion London Regiment was raised, with the original battalion being renumbered 1/23rd Battalion. Part of 181st (2/6th London) Brigade in 2/2nd London Division (later renamed 60th (London) Division), the new battalion supplied drafts of men to 1/23rd Battalion until autumn 1915, landing in France for active service on 26 June 1916. It remained on the Western Front until October 1916, when it sailed for the Macedonian front, where it spent six months. Its next theatre of war was Palestine, where it remained until May 1918, when it returned to the Western Front for the remainder of the war.

When 1/23rd Battalion sailed for France another draft-finding battalion was formed to free up 2/23rd Battalion for active service. This new battalion was numbered 3/23rd Battalion and remained in Britain throughout the war, including time on coastal defence duties in Norfolk and Suffolk whilst based at Benacre Park near Wrentham, Suffolk in early summer 1918.

== Interwar ==
When the London Regiment was dissolved in 1938, the battalion became the 42nd Royal Tank Regiment.

== World War II ==
42nd Royal Tank Regiment and its wartime duplicate, 48th Royal Tank Regiment, fought in North Africa, including the Battle of Alamein, and in Italy and North West Europe.

== Postwar ==
Following the re-establishment of the Territorial Army in 1947 the Regiment remained as 42nd Royal Tank Regiment until 1956, when a reduction in Territorial Army armoured regiments meant the regiment became the 23rd London again. Further reductions in the size of the Territorial Army in 1961 saw the unit merged to become a Territorial battalion of the newly formed Queen's Royal Surrey Regiment.

== Heritage & ceremonial ==
=== Traditions & insignia ===
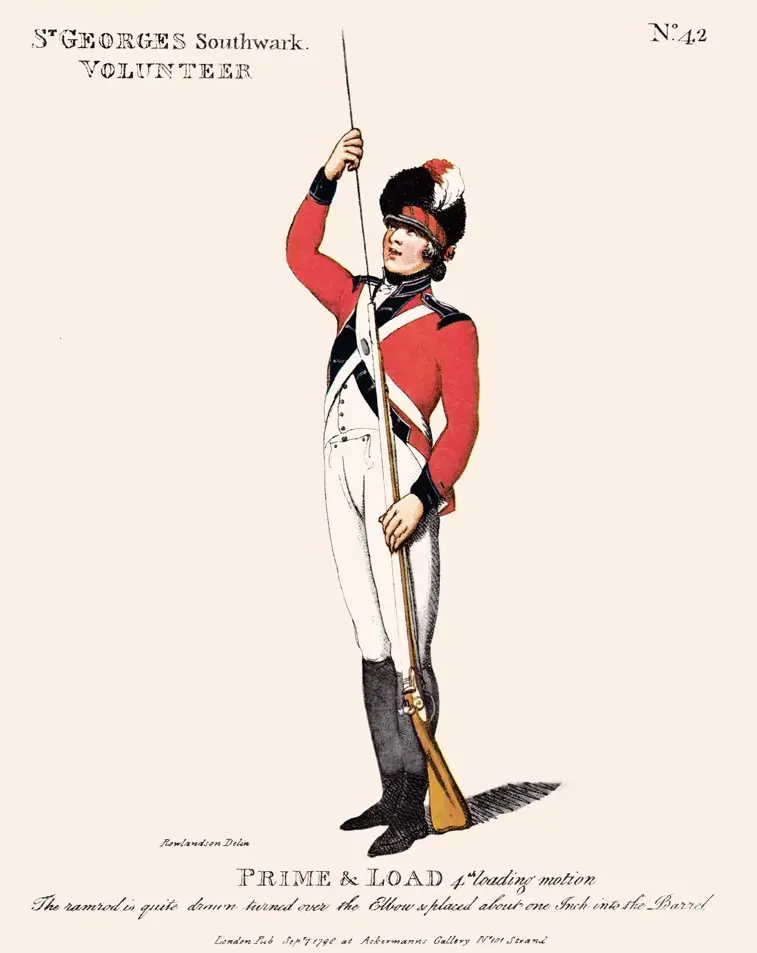
1798 engraving of a St George the Martyr Southwark Association private

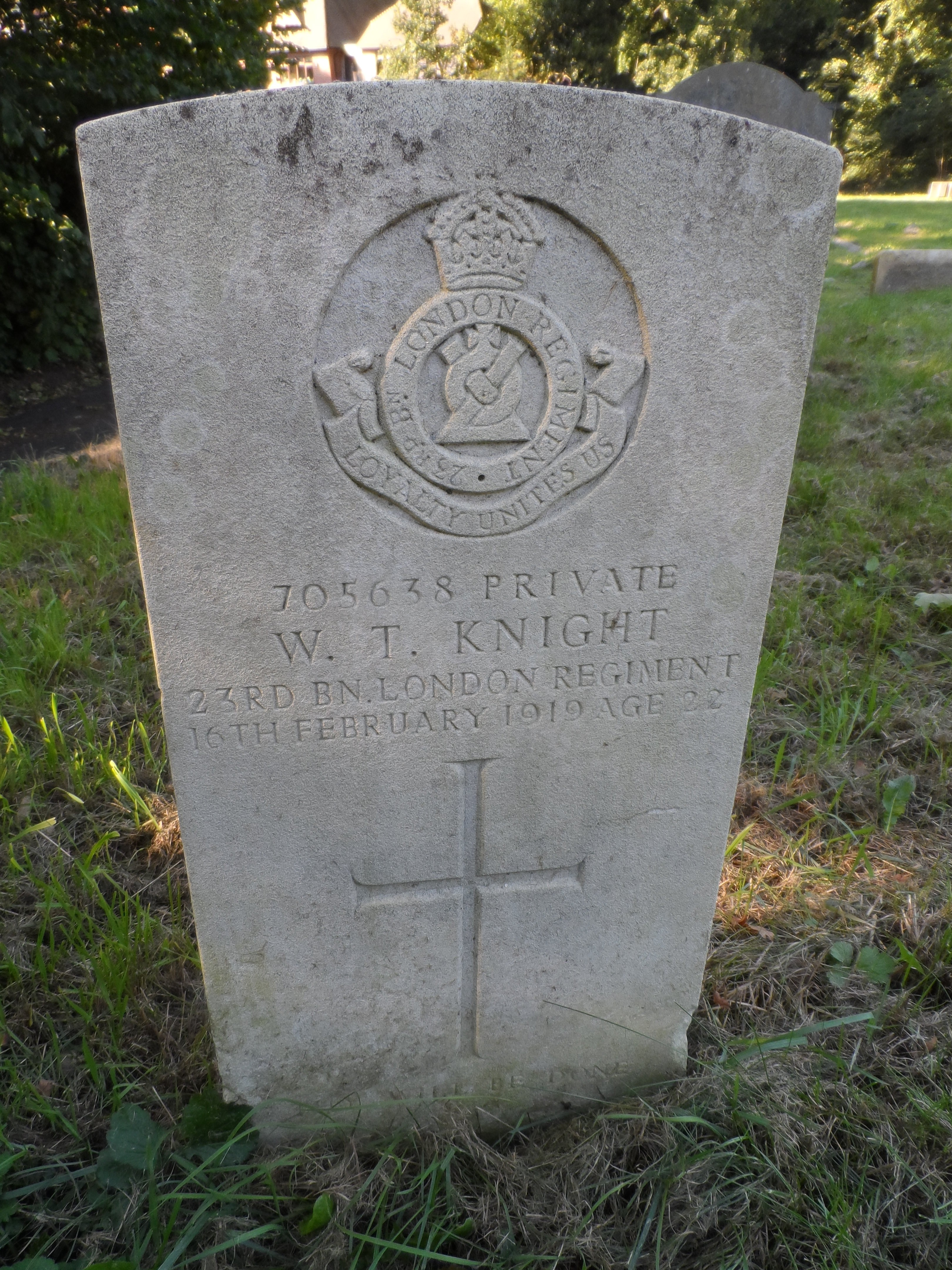
Headstone of Private W. T. Knight of the 23rd Londons in the churchyard of Busbridge Church, Surrey, showing the regimental crest incorporating the Bridge House Mark of Southwark.

The 7th Surrey RVC, and later the 23rd Londons, claimed to be the lineal descendants of several British Volunteer Corps infantry units raised in South East London in 1798 during the French Revolutionary Wars. These included the Newington Surry Volunteers, Loyal Southwark Volunteers, St George the Martyr Southwark Association, St John Southwark Association and St Mary Newington Association. The two colours of the Newington Surry Volunteers and the single colour of the St John Southwark Association were presented to the 7th Surrey RVC on its formation and were paraded as late as 1872 before being hung in the officers' mess at Clapham Junction. One of the colours of the St Mary Newington Association bore the Bridge House Mark (a combination of the Greek letter X for Christ, with the triangle of the Trinity and the circle of eternity), the symbol of Southwark. This symbol, described heraldically as "an annulet ensigned with a cross pattée and interlaced with a saltire conjoined in base", was incorporated into the regimental badge of the 23rd Londons, where it appeared in a crowned circle bearing the regimental title, a scroll underneath carrying the motto 'Loyalty Unites Us'. This insignia was incorporated into the regimental colour presented in 1909 and was engraved on the headstones erected by the Commonwealth War Graves Commission on First World War-era graves of members of 23rd Londons.

After its service with the Royal Tank Regiment the battalion was awarded the distinction of the RTR badge with the dates 1941–45, which appears in the corner of the Regimental colour of the 4th Queen's Royal Surreys, together with three scrolls for North West Europe, North Africa and Italy.

=== Uniforms ===
In 1870 the 7th Surrey RVC adopted a Rifle green uniform with scarlet facings, similar to the 60th Rifles. After it became a VB of the East Surreys it adopted the scarlet uniform with white facings of that regiment. Until 1900 the band wore a white plume that gained them the nickname 'Kennington Guards'. Khaki service dress was issued to the TF battalion and after 1908 the scarlet tunic was reserved for ceremonial occasions.

=== Honorary Colonels ===
The following served as Honorary Colonel of the battalion:

- Francis Marcus Beresford, MP, first CO, appointed 25 January 1873
- Sydney Stern, 1st Baron Wandsworth, appointed 16 February 1889, died 10 February 1912
- Col B.T.L. Thomson, VD, former CO, appointed wef 10 February 1912
- Maj Hon John Jacob Astor, MP, (later 1st Baron Astor of Hever) appointed 18 April 1928

=== Battle Honours ===
The battalion was awarded the following Battle honours:

Second Boer War (4th VB, East Surreys):
South Arica 1900–02
World War I (1/23rd & 2/23rd Londons):
Festubert 1915, Loos, Somme 1916, '18, Flers-Courcelette, Le Transloy, Messines 1917, Cambrai 1917, St Quentin, Ancre 1918, Albert 1918, Bapaume 1918, Ypres 1918, Courtrai, France and Flanders 1915-18, Doiran 1917, Macedonia 1916-17, Gaza, El Mughar, Nebi Samwil, Jerusalem, Jericho, Jordan, Tell 'Asur, Palestine 1917-18
World War II (42nd & 48th RTR):
North West Europe, North Africa, Italy

The honours listed in bold were inscribed on the colours.

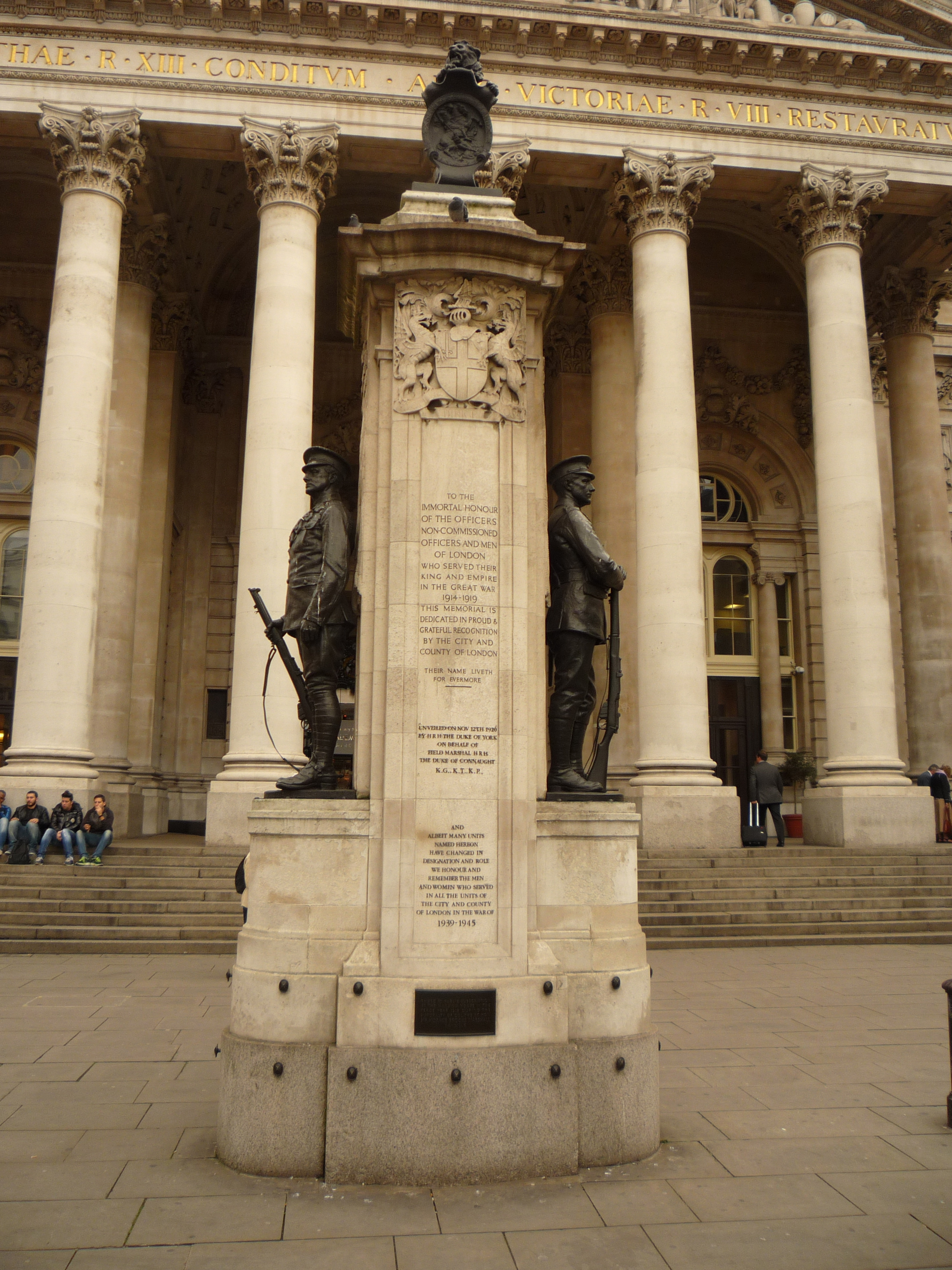
London Troops Memorial at the Royal Exchange.

=== Memorials ===
The 23rd Bn London Regiment is listed on the City and County of London Troops Memorial in front of the Royal Exchange, with architectural design by Sir Aston Webb and sculpture by Alfred Drury. The right-hand (southern) bronze figure flanking this memorial depicts an infantryman representative of the various London infantry units.

There is a World War I memorial to the 23rd Londons at St Mary's Church, Battersea. There are memorial boards to the 23rd Londons in World War I and to the 42nd RTR in World War II at the Army Reserve Centre, 27 St John's Hill.

The regimental colours presented to the 23rd Londons at Windsor Castle on 19 June 1909 are laid up in St Mary's Church, Battersea. The colours of the 4th Bn Queen's Regiment presented at Woking in 1963 were laid up in Southwark Cathedral in 1980.
