= Edward Clarke (barrister) =

British politician (1841–1931)

The Right Honourable Sir Edward Clarke KC
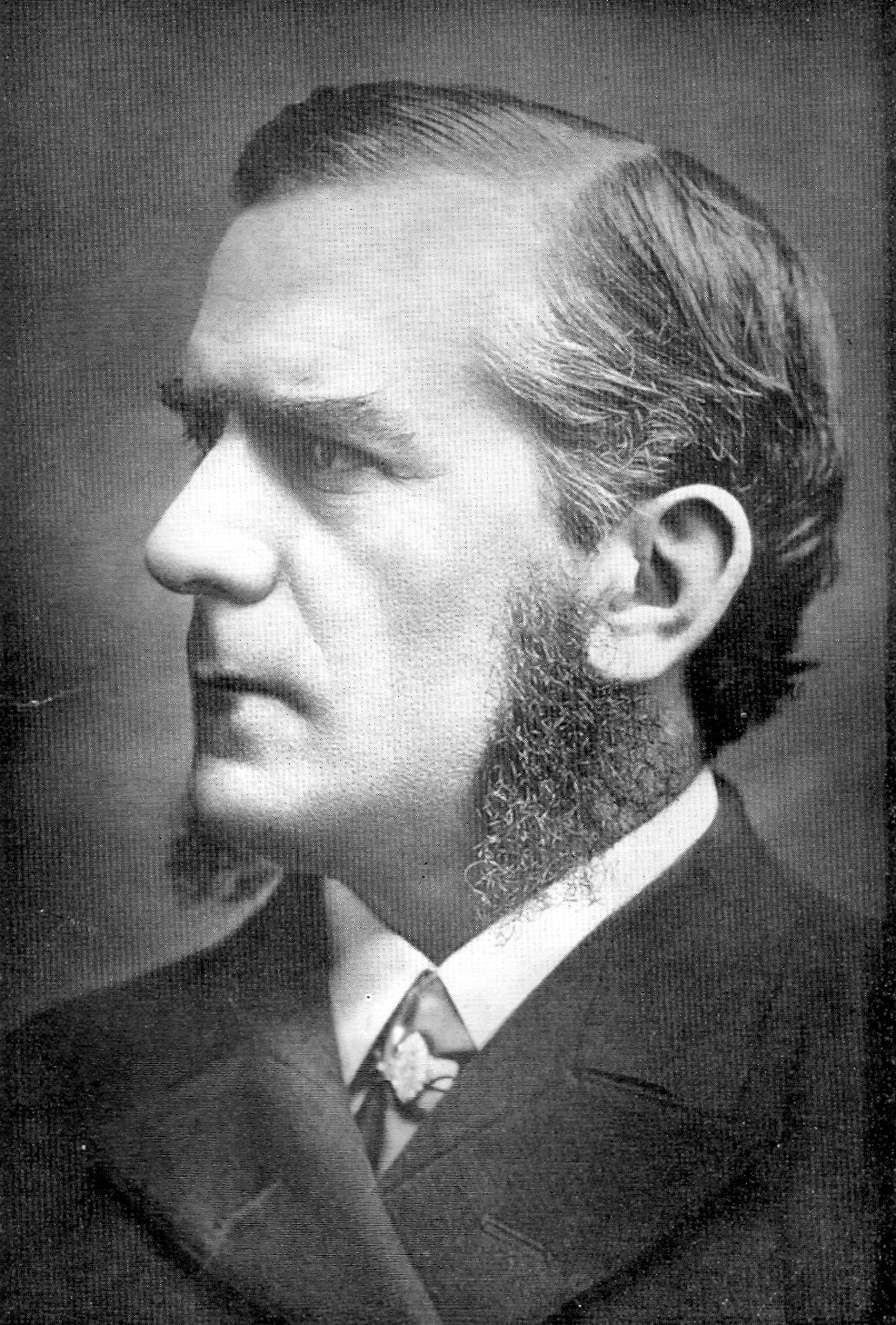
- Born: 15 February 1841
- Died: 26 April 1931 (aged 90)
- Occupations: Barrister and politician
- Children: At least 2, including William

Sir Edward George Clarke, KC (15 February 1841 – 26 April 1931) was a British barrister and politician, considered one of the leading advocates of the late Victorian era and serving as Solicitor-General in the Conservative government of 1886–1892. His legal career included unsuccessfully representing Oscar Wilde in his disastrous prosecution of the Marquess of Queensberry for libel, and unsuccessfully representing the plaintiff in the "baccarat case", during which Sir Edward cross-examined the Prince of Wales. He was a member of the anti-women's suffrage movement.

== Background and early life ==
Clarke was the son of J. G. Clarke of Moorgate Street, London. He was educated at King's College London. In 1859 he became a writer in India Office, but resigned in the next year, and became a law reporter. He obtained a Tancred Scholarship in 1861, and was called to the bar at Lincoln's Inn in 1864, joining the Home Circuit.

== Legal career ==
Clarke quickly gained a high reputation at the junior bar, and made his name appearing for the defence in the two most notorious cases of 1877, securing the acquittal of his namesake Chief Inspector Clarke in the Great Scotland Yard scandal (when other senior CID detectives were convicted of corruption) and unsuccessfully defending Patrick Staunton (who had been accused of complicity in starving his sister-in-law to death) in the Penge Murder. On the back of these successes Clarke took silk in 1880, and quickly came to be recognised as one of the leading members of the bar; he became a bencher of Lincoln's Inn in 1882, and was knighted in 1886. He also entered Parliament as Conservative MP for Southwark at a by-election early in 1880, but being unable to hold the seat at the general election later that year he was elected instead for Plymouth. He was Solicitor-General in the Conservative administration of 1886–1892, but declined office when the party returned to power in 1895 as he would have been debarred from continuing his lucrative private practice.

In 1899, Clarke found himself in total disagreement with his party over the government's South African policy, and in early February 1900 his constituency party in Plymouth called upon him to resign his seat. He resigned the following day. He did not contest the general election of 1900, but returned to the House as MP for the City of London in 1906; however, he offended a section of his constituents by a speech against tariff reform in the House of Commons on 12 March 1906, and shortly afterwards he resigned his seat again on grounds of health.

He published a Treatise on the Law of Extradition in 1903, and several volumes of speeches (both political and legal). He also wrote a biography of Benjamin Disraeli. His autobiography, The Story of My Life, was published in 1918, and a biography by Derek Walker-Smith and his grandson Edward Clarke (Life of Sir Edward Clarke) followed in 1939.

== Famous cases ==
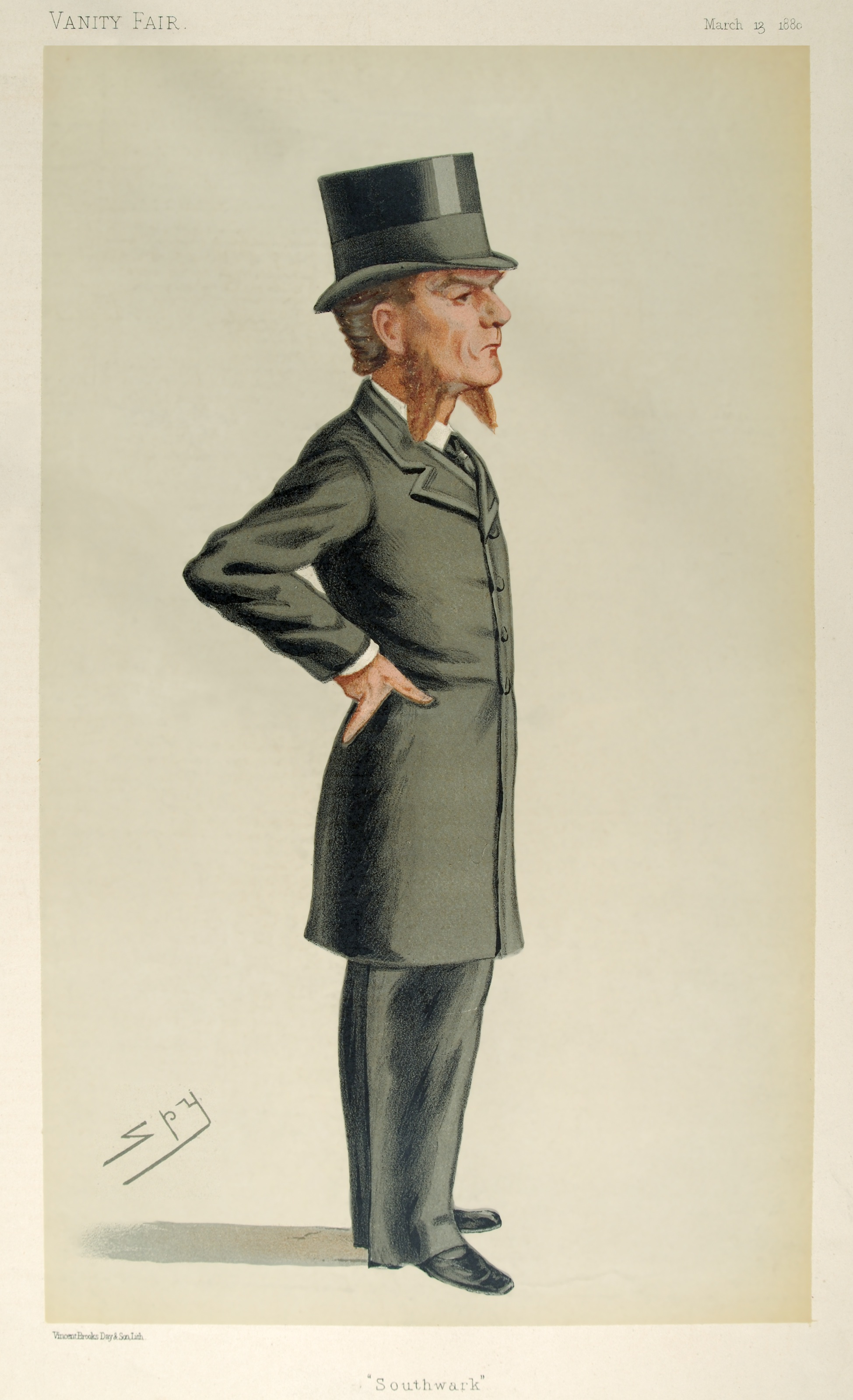
"Southwark". Caricature by Spy published in Vanity Fair in 1880.

- R v Clarke and Others, 1877 (The Trial of the Detectives). Clarke secured the acquittal of Chief Inspector Clarke, the acting head of the Detective Department at Scotland Yard, on charges of corruption. Three other, more junior, police officers were convicted, and the detective division of the Metropolitan Police was completely reorganised as a result.
- R v Staunton, Staunton, Staunton and Rhodes, 1877 (The Penge Murder). Harriet Staunton, a mentally-disabled woman of 38, had died at Penge in Kent, apparently of starvation. Her husband, Lewis Staunton, together with his brother, his brother's wife and his mistress (who was his brother's wife's sister) were charged with murdering her by deliberate neglect; although they were charged only with one murder, it was generally believed that they were also responsible for the death of Harriet's baby son, also by starvation. Clarke unsuccessfully defended Patrick Staunton, the brother; although all four were convicted and sentenced to death, sufficient doubt about the strict legal position had been raised at the trial that the sentences of the three Stauntons were commuted to penal servitude for life, and the fourth defendant, Alice Rhodes, was given a free pardon.
- R v Bartlett, 1886 (The Pimlico Mystery). Clarke defended Adelaide Bartlett on a charge of having murdered her husband by poisoning with chloroform; she was acquitted.
- Gordon-Cumming v. Wilson and Others, 1891 (The Royal Baccarat Case or Tranby Croft Scandal). Clarke represented Sir William Gordon-Cumming, who sued five people for slander after being accused of cheating at cards. The case was notorious because the Prince of Wales, later King Edward VII, had been banker during the game in which Gordon-Cumming was said to have cheated; the prince was called as a witness, and vigorously cross-examined by Clarke. Nevertheless, Gordon-Cumming lost the case.
- Wilde v Queensberry, 1895; R v Wilde, 1895. Clarke represented Oscar Wilde in his ill-advised prosecution of the Marquess of Queensberry for criminal libel. Queensberry being found not guilty, Clarke considered himself partly to blame for the tactics pursued during the trial, and when Wilde was subsequently arrested and prosecuted for homosexual practices, Clarke considered himself duty-bound to undertake the defence, which he did while refusing to accept a fee. Clarke was initially widely condemned for doing so, even within the legal profession, outraged as much by a barrister appearing without a fee as by their revulsion for Wilde, although opinions were later reversed. In the first trial, when Clarke's conduct of the defence was described by the prosecuting counsel as "courageous and brilliant", the jury disagreed; but Clarke was unable to persuade the jury in the re-trial against a guilty verdict.
- R. v Jameson, Willoughby and others, 1896. Clarke unsuccessfully defended Leander Starr Jameson for his organisation of the Jameson Raid. Jameson was convicted and sentenced to fifteen months in jail, but was soon pardoned, and was generally treated as a national hero.

== Family ==
Clarke's son, Percival Clark, was a prominent lawyer in the 1920s and 1930s. His great-nephew, Edward Clarke, followed him into law and was number two to Frederick Geoffrey Lawrence in the defence team for suspected serial killer John Bodkin Adams. His youngest son William Clarke trained as a lawyer, but became a cryptographer joining Admiralty Intelligence in 1915 and going on to serve at Bletchley Park during WWII.

== Arms ==
Coat of arms of Edward Clarke
Motto Fide Et Labore

Parliament of the United Kingdom
Preceded by John Locke; Marcus Beresford	Member of Parliament for Southwark; 1880 Southwark by-election–1880 With: Marcus Beresford	Succeeded by Arthur Cohen; Thorold Rogers
Preceded by Peter Stewart Macliver; Sir Edward Bates, Bt	Member of Parliament for Plymouth; 1880–1900; With: Peter Stewart Macliver 1880–1885; Sir Edward Bates, Bt 1885–1892; Sir William Pearce, Bt 1892–1895; Charles Harrison 1895–1898; Sigismund Mendl 1898–1900	Succeeded by Sigismund Mendl; Hon. Ivor Guest
Preceded by Alban Gibbs; Sir Joseph Dimsdale, Bt	Member of Parliament for City of London; 1906–1906; With: Alban Gibbs Jan–Feb 1906; Arthur Balfour Feb–Jun 1906	Succeeded by Sir Frederick Banbury, Bt; Arthur Balfour
Legal offices
Preceded by Sir Horace Davey	Solicitor General for England and Wales; 1886–1892	Succeeded by Sir John Rigby
