= 1880 Southwark by-election =

UK Parliamentary by-election

The 1880 Southwark by-election was fought on 13 February 1880. The by-election was fought due to the death of the incumbent Liberal MP, John Locke. It was won by the Conservative candidate Edward Clarke.

Southwark by-election, 1880
Party	Candidate	Votes	%	±%
Conservative	Edward Clarke	7,683	50.2	+18.9
Liberal	A. Dunn	6,830	44.6	−4.9
Independent	George Shipton	799	5.2	−14.0
Majority		853	5.6	N/A
Turnout		15,312	65.2	+6.6
Conservative gain from Liberal		Swing	+11.9	

The 21st parliament was dissolved some weeks later and a general election was held. Clarke was defeated and the seat was gained by the Liberal candidate Arthur Cohen.
