= John Baker (Southwark MP) =

English politician (died 1406)

John Baker (died 1406) was an English politician. He sat as MP for Southwark in 1406.

He also served as tax collector of Southwark in November 1404.

He was the son of John Baker of Southwark.
