= John Northampton (disambiguation) =

John Northampton was Mayor of London.

John Northampton may also refer to:

- John Northampton (priest)
- John Northampton (Southwark MP)
