= 1870 Southwark by-election =

UK Parliamentary by-election

The 1870 Southwark by-election was fought on 17 February 1870. The by-election was fought due to the resignation (Ambassador to Spain) of the incumbent MP of the Liberal Party, Austen Henry Layard. It was won by the Conservative candidate Marcus Beresford.

Southwark by-election, 1870
| Party | Candidate | Votes | % | ±% |
|---|---|---|---|---|
| Conservative | Marcus Beresford | 4,686 | 38.9 | +21.6 |
| Lib-Lab | George Odger | 4,382 | 36.4 | N/A |
| Liberal | S. H. Waterlow | 2,966 | 24.6 | −58.1 |
| Majority | | 304 | 2.5 | N/A |
| Turnout | | 12,034 | 68.0 | +20.2 |
| Conservative gain from Liberal | | Swing | +39.9 | |
