= Richard Hutton =

Richard Hutton may refer to:

- Richard Hutton (died 1604), MP for Southwark
- Richard Hutton (cricketer) (born 1942), former English cricketer
- Richard Holt Hutton (1826–1897), English writer and theologian
- Sir Richard Hutton (1560–1639), Yorkshire landowner and lawyer
- Sir Richard Hutton, the younger (1594–1645), 17th-century MP for Knaresborough and landowner
