= Richard Hutton (died 1604) =

Member of the Parliament of England

Richard Hutton (died 1604) was an English Member of Parliament.

He was an armourer by trade and an alderman of London. He was elected a Member (MP) of the Parliament of England for Southwark in 1584, 1586, 1589, 1595 and 1597.

Parliament of England
| Preceded by Oliffe Burr; Thomas Way | Member of Parliament for Southwark; 1584–1601; With: Thomas Way 1584–1586; Thomas Cure 1586–1589; William Pratt 1589–1593; Hugh Browker 1593–1597; Edmund Bowyer 1597–1601 | Succeeded by Mathew Dale; Zachariah Locke |
