= Thomas Spencer (MP for Southwark) =

English politician (fl. 1398–1420)

Thomas Spencer (fl. 1398–1420) was an English politician. He sat as member of the Parliament of England for Southwark in 1406, May 1413 and 1415.

Spencer had married Joan, daughter of Richard Burn of Southwark, by 1398, the year in which the couple leased a messuage and its appurtenances in Southwark to Richard Neville. Although he was then called a citizen of London, his History of Parliament biographer identifies him with the Thomas Spencer "of Surrey" who stood surety with other local men in July 1398, October 1400 and November 1407. The marriage had evidently made him well off, and from about the turn of the century he appears to have kept an inn in the borough.

He was first returned for Southwark to the Parliament of 1406. John Stanley afterwards put it about that Spencer and John Baker II, the borough's other member, had deliberately concealed their real names and humble origins at the election; the charge was baseless, and the two men brought a suit against Stanley in the Court of Chancery.

Spencer and his wife were repeatedly at law over property in Southwark. In the Hilary term of 1407 they sued a London brewer for two messuages and their appurtenances; in September 1414 they were summoned as defendants before the justices at Guildford; and in December 1416 they defended an assize of novel disseisin brought over Southwark property, resting their case on Joan's title to lands and tenements settled on her by her late father.

In December 1415 Spencer and his associate William Weldon paid £20 into the Exchequer for the marriage of Thomas Pyrly, a minor in royal wardship. He was made a collector of taxes in Southwark in November 1419, and was still living in May 1420, when he witnessed two deeds there; nothing further is known of him.
