= Henry Thymelby =

Member of the Parliament of England

Henry Thymelby (fl. 1386) was an English Member of Parliament.

He was a Member (MP) of the Parliament of England for Southwark in 1386.
