= John Sayer (MP) =

English member of parliament (1499–1562)

John Sayer (1499–1562) was a Member of the Parliament of England. He represented Southwark in parliamentary sessions in 1547, March 1553, October 1553, April 1554 and November 1554.

Sayer was a well-to-do "merchant, clothier and innkeeper". He married and had one daughter and two sons. In his will, he left money for an annual payment for the maintenance of a grammar school that he had founded.
