= Marcus Beresford (Conservative politician) =

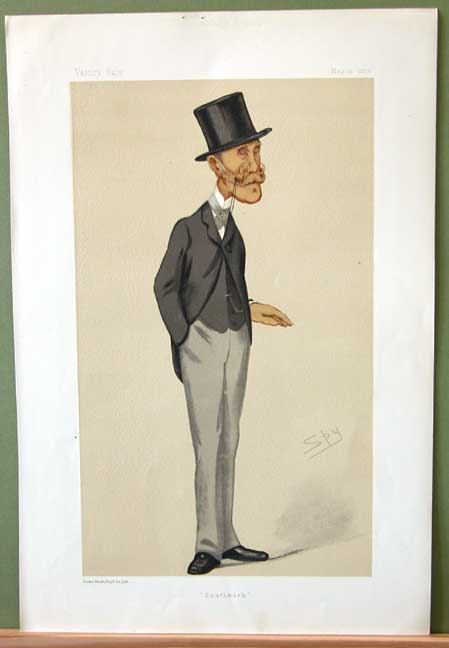
"Southwark". Caricature by Spy published in Vanity Fair in 1876.

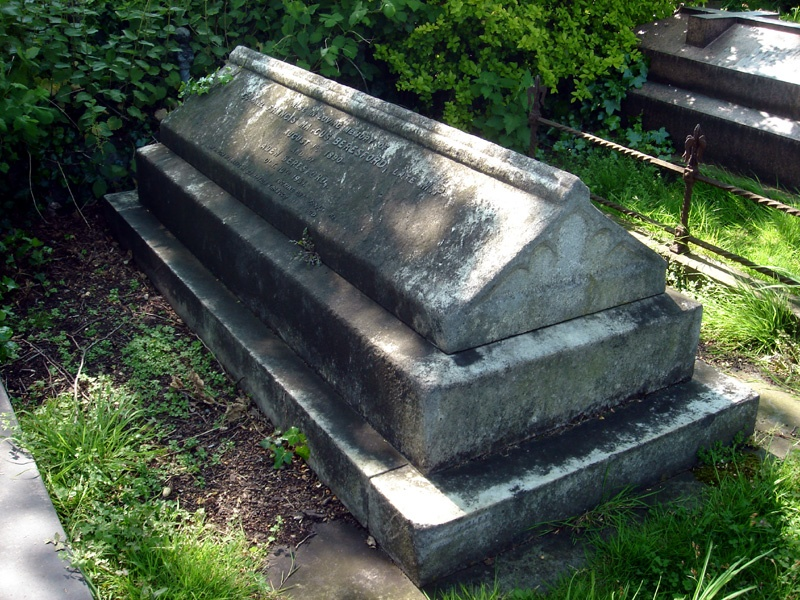
Funerary monument, Brompton Cemetery, London

Colonel Francis Marcus Beresford (August 1818 – 1 August 1890) was a British Conservative Party politician.

== Early life and education ==
He was born at Aylestone, Leicestershire, the fourth son of Rev Gilbert Beresford and his wife Anne. He was educated at King's College School, and went into business as a wharfinger.

== Career ==
During the invasion scare of 1859, Beresford raised the 7th (Southwark) Surrey Rifle Volunteer Corps in December and commanded it with the rank of Captain-Commandant. By February 1860 the unit had six companies, and Beresford was promoted to Major-Commandant. He was promoted to Lieutenant-Colonel on 19 November 1864. After his retirement from the command, he was appointed the honorary colonel of the battalion (later the 4th Volunteer Battalion, East Surrey Regiment) on 25 January 1873.

He was elected at a by-election in February 1870 as a Member of Parliament (MP) for Southwark. He was re-elected in 1874, and held the seat until he stood down at the 1880 general election.

== Personal life ==
He married twice. Firstly, Elizabeth Green, the daughter of George Green, on 20 September 1848 at St. Oswald Parish Church, Durham. They had six children. Secondly, Eleanor Richardson on 2 June 1881 at St. George, Hanover Square, London. His daughter Selina (1859–1938) married Sir Hay Frederick Donaldson, the son of Sir Stuart Donaldson.

He died on 1 August 1890 at Cliftonthorpe, Ashby-de-la-Zouch, Leicestershire, and is buried in Brompton Cemetery, London.

Parliament of the United Kingdom
Preceded by John Locke; Austen Henry Layard	Member of Parliament for Southwark; 1870 – 1880; With: John Locke to 1880; Edward Clarke 1880	Succeeded by Arthur Cohen; Thorold Rogers
