= Apsley Pellatt =

English glassware manufacturer and politician

Apsley Pellatt (27 November 1791 – 17 August 1863) was an English glassware manufacturer and politician.

He was the son of glassware maker Apsley Pellatt (1763–1826) and Mary (née Maberly) Pellatt.

== Glassmaking career ==
He joined the family glass-making company of Pellatt and Green in 1811. He took over the London-based glass-works on his father's death, renaming it Apsley Pellatt & Co.

His main interest lay in the chemistry of glass-making. In 1819, he took out his first patent for the manufacture of "sulfides" or Cameo Incrustations. Pellatt originally called them "Crystallo-Ceramie," reflecting their French origin. The process involved the embedding of ceramic figurines into the glass sides of paperweights, jugs, decanters, etc., by cutting a hole in the hot glass, sliding in the insert, and resealing the glass afterward.

Pellatt became the most famous and successful producers of sulfides in England from 1819 to the mid-century rivalled only by Baccarat in France. He described their manufacture in a book on glass-making entitled "Curiosities of Glassmaking" published in 1849. After his retirement around 1850, the glass-works went into decline in the hands of his brother Frederic.

== Political career ==
Pellatt was a public-spirited man who for some years served on the Common Council of the City of London. He unsuccessfully contested Bristol at the 1847 general election, and was elected at the 1852 general election as a Member of Parliament (MP) for Southwark. He held the seat until his defeat at the 1857 general election. He was unsuccessful when he stood again in 1859.

== Death ==
Pellatt died in Balham in 1863 and was buried at the family mausoleum at Staines, where he had lived in later life.

== Family ==
Pellatt married twice, firstly in 1814 to Sophronia, daughter of Thomas Kemp; she died in 1815 aged only 23.

He married secondly, in Streatham in 1816, to Margaret Elizabeth, daughter of George Evans, of Balham, with whom he had one son, Apsley (who died young) and four daughters. His second wife died in 1874 and was buried alongside him. His younger brother, Mill Pellatt (1795-1863) was grandfather of Canadian financier Sir Henry Pellatt.

Parliament of the United Kingdom
Preceded by John Humphery; Sir William Molesworth, Bt	Member of Parliament for Southwark; 1852 – 1857; With: Sir William Molesworth, Bt to 1855; Sir Charles Napier from 1855	Succeeded by John Locke; Sir Charles Napier
