= William Porter (fl. 1388) =

William Porter (fl. 1388) was an English Member of Parliament (MP) and grocer.

He was a Member of the Parliament of England for Southwark in February 1388.
