= John Eston (died 1565) =

English politician

John Eston (by 1518–1565), was an English politician.

He was a Member (MP) of the Parliament of England for Wigan in 1545, Cirencester in 1547 and Southwark in March 1553, April 1554, November 1554, 1555, 1558 and 1559.
