= William Beeche =

English member of parliament

William Beeche (fl. 1386) was an English Member of Parliament (MP).

He was a Member of the Parliament of England for Southwark in 1386.
