= Roger Chandler (politician) =

English Member of Parliament

Roger Chandler (died 1401 or after) was an English Member of Parliament (MP).

He was a Member of the Parliament of England for Southwark in February 1383 and September 1388.
