= Sir William Molesworth, 8th Baronet =

19th-century English politician

The Right Honourable Sir William Molesworth Bt
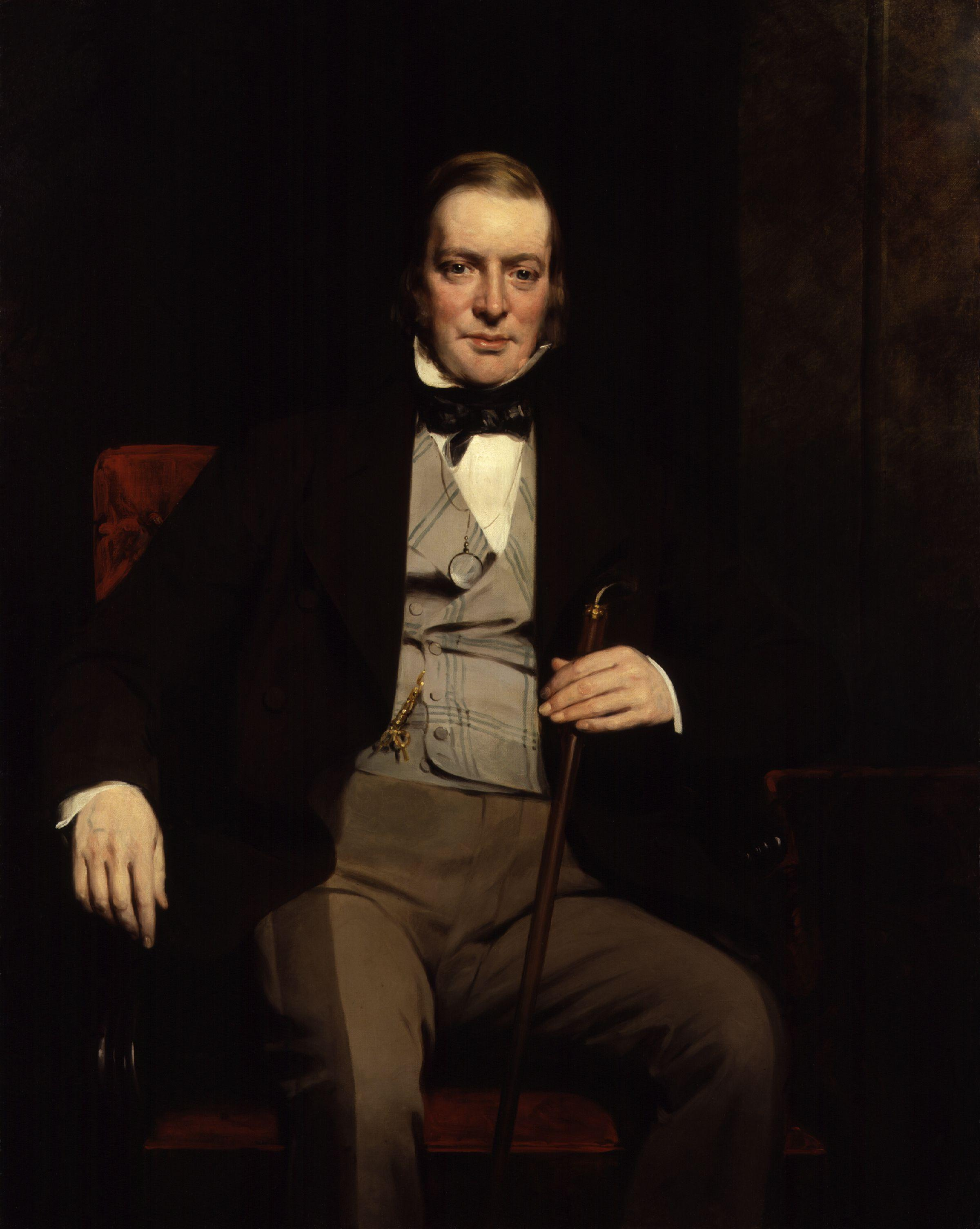
- Portrait by John Watson Gordon, 1854

First Commissioner of Works
- In office 5 January 1853 – 30 January 1855
- Monarch: Victoria
- Prime Minister: The Earl of Aberdeen
- Preceded by: Lord John Manners
- Succeeded by: Sir Benjamin Hall, Bt

Secretary of State for the Colonies
- In office 21 July 1855 – 22 October 1855
- Monarch: Victoria
- Prime Minister: The Viscount Palmerston
- Preceded by: Lord John Russell
- Succeeded by: Henry Labouchere

Personal details
- Born: 23 May 1810 London
- Died: 22 October 1855 (aged 45)
- Party: Radical
- Education: University of Cambridge

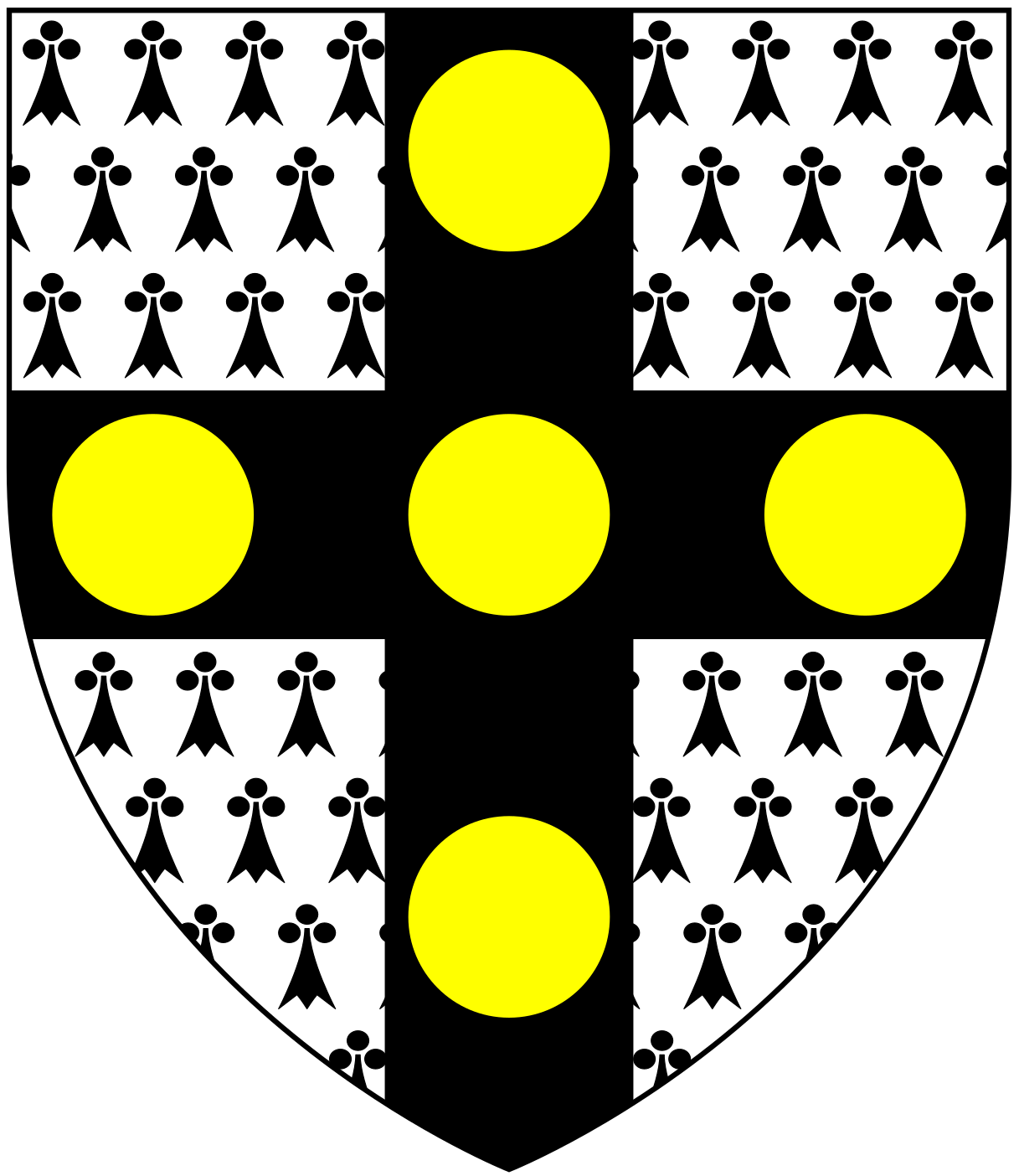
Arms of St Aubyn, as quartered by the Molesworth-St Aubyn Baronets of Pencarrow: Ermine, on a cross sable five bezants

Sir William Molesworth, 8th Baronet, PC (23 May 1810 – 22 October 1855) was a Radical British politician, who served in the coalition cabinet of The Earl of Aberdeen from 1853 until 1855 as First Commissioner of Works, and then in the Whig cabinet of Henry John Temple, 3rd Viscount Palmerston from 1855 until his death later that year as Secretary of State for the Colonies.

Much later, when justifying to the Queen his own new appointments, Gladstone told her: "For instance, even in Ld Aberdeen's Govt, in 52, Sir William Molesworth had been selected, at that time, a very advanced Radical, but who was perfectly harmless, & took little, or no part... He said these people generally became very moderate, when they were in office", which she admitted had been the case.

== Background ==
Molesworth was born in London and succeeded to the baronetcy in 1823. He was educated privately before entering St John's College, Cambridge as a fellow commoner. Moving to Trinity College, he fought a duel with his tutor, and was sent down from the university. He also studied abroad and at Edinburgh University for some time. Molesworth was a member of the London Electrical Society.

== Political career ==
On the passing of the Reform Act 1832 Molesworth was returned to Parliament for the Eastern division of Cornwall, to support the ministry of Lord Grey. Through Charles Buller he made the acquaintance of George Grote and James Mill, and in April 1835 he founded, in conjunction with Roebuck, the London Review, as an organ of the Philosophic Radicals. After the publication of two volumes he purchased the Westminster Review, and for some time the united magazines were edited by him and John Stuart Mill. Buller and Molesworth were associated with Edward Gibbon Wakefield and his schemes for colonising South Australia, Canada and New Zealand.

Select Committee on Transportation (1837–38)

In 1837 Molesworth was appointed to chair a Parliamentary Select Committee established to investigate the system of penal transportation to New South Wales and Van Diemen's Land, and to assess whether it should be continued, modified, or abolished. The committee's membership included Lord John Russell, Sir Robert Peel, Sir George Grey, and law reformer Thomas Fowell Buxton.

The committee sat entirely in London. Molesworth did not visit the colonies, and evidence was gathered through the testimony of twenty-three witnesses who appeared before the committee in London — drawn predominantly from those who already opposed transportation, including colonial officials, former settlers, and others who had returned to Britain. The committee's composition and witness list have since attracted criticism: historians have noted that it had been assembled with an existing antagonism towards the assignment system, and that the hearings functioned less as an impartial inquiry than as a platform for views Molesworth already held.

The committee reported in August 1838. Its principal conclusions were that transportation had failed both as a deterrent to crime in Britain and as a system of punishment and reform in the colonies; that the assignment of convicts to private masters produced arbitrary and unequal treatment unrelated to the nature of offenders' crimes; and that the system as a whole was morally corrupting to colonial society. The report recommended that transportation should cease as soon as practicable, to be replaced by hard labour; that convicts should be housed in penal establishments remote from free settlement; and that the process of granting early release should be made more consistent and orderly.

Despite the methodological limitations of the inquiry, its immediate impact was significant: transportation to New South Wales was abolished in 1840, and the assignment system was wound up by 1841. Transportation to Van Diemen's Land continued until 1853.

Later historical scholarship, particularly Hamish Maxwell-Stewart's quantitative work on VDL conduct records, has argued that the report's influence on specific punishment practices such as flogging has been overstated, and that shifts in punishment strategies were already underway in the colonies before the committee met.

From 1837 to 1841 Molesworth sat for Leeds, and acquired considerable influence in the House of Commons by his speeches and by his tact in presiding over the select committee on penal transportation. But his Radicalism made little impression either on the house or on his constituency. In 1839 he commenced and carried to completion, at a cost of £6,000, a reprint of the entire miscellaneous and voluminous writings of Thomas Hobbes, which were placed in most of the English university and provincial libraries. The publication did him great disservice in public life, his opponents endeavouring to identify him with the freethinking opinions of Hobbes in religion as well as with the philosopher's conclusions in favour of despotic government. From 1841 to 1845 he had no seat in parliament, but in 1842 served as High Sheriff of Cornwall. He held the living of St Ervan parish, with the right to appoint the rector.

In 1845 Molesworth was returned for Southwark, and retained that seat until his death. On his return to parliament he devoted special attention to the condition of the colonies, and was the ardent champion of their self-government. In January 1853, Lord Aberdeen included him as the only Radical in his coalition cabinet as First Commissioner of Works, the chief work by which his name was brought into prominence at this time being the construction of the new Westminster Bridge; he also was the first to open Kew Gardens on Sundays. In July 1855, he was made Colonial Secretary, an office he held until his death in October of the same year.

== Personal life ==
It is known that Molesworth collected, paraphrased and published many of the works of Thomas Hobbes between 1839 and 1845 in the eleven volumes of The English Works of Thomas Hobbes of Malmesbury; Now First Collected and Edited by Sir William Molesworth, Bart. Those works included Hobbes's translation of the Iliad.

Molesworth became engaged in June and married Andalusia Grant Carstairs on 9 July 1844. She had been a singer and was not from a noble family. Molesworth's family were opposed to the match.

He died on 22 October 1855, aged 45. He had no children, and the baronetcy passed to a cousin. He is buried at Kensal Green Cemetery, London, on the north side of the main path leading from the entrance to the central chapel.

The philanthropist John Passmore Edwards installed a likeness of Sir William Molesworth as a memorial medallion in the Borough Road public library in Southwark as a mark of appreciation such that, "In so doing, we gratefully remember illustrious and useful lives into whose labours we have entered, and keep before us examples worthy of admiration."

Molesworth, Victoria, Australia, is named after Sir William.

== Biography ==
- Millicent Garrett Fawcett, Life of the Right Hon. Sir William Molesworth, London: Macmillan, 1901
- Alison Adburgham, A Radical Aristocrat: the Rt. Hon. Sir William Molesworth, Bart., PC, MP of Pencarrow and his wife Andalusia. (Padstow: Tabb House, 1980)

Parliament of the United Kingdom
New constituency	Member of Parliament for East Cornwall; 1832–1837; With: Sir William Salusbury-Trelawny, Bt	Succeeded by Lord Eliot; Sir Hussey Vivian, Bt
Preceded by Sir John Beckett, Bt; Edward Baines	Member of Parliament for Leeds; 1837–1841; With: Edward Baines	Succeeded by William Beckett; William Aldam
Preceded by Benjamin Wood; John Humphery	Member of Parliament for Southwark; 1845–1855; With: John Humphery to 1852; Apsley Pellatt from 1852	Succeeded by Sir Charles Napier; Apsley Pellatt
Political offices
Preceded by Lord John Manners	First Commissioner of Works; 1853–1855	Succeeded by Sir Benjamin Hall, Bt
Preceded by Lord John Russell	Secretary of State for the Colonies; 1855	Succeeded by Henry Labouchere
Baronetage of England
Preceded by Arscott Ourry Molesworth	Baronet (of Pencarrow); 1823–1855	Succeeded by Hugh Henry Molesworth
