= John Humphery =

British politician

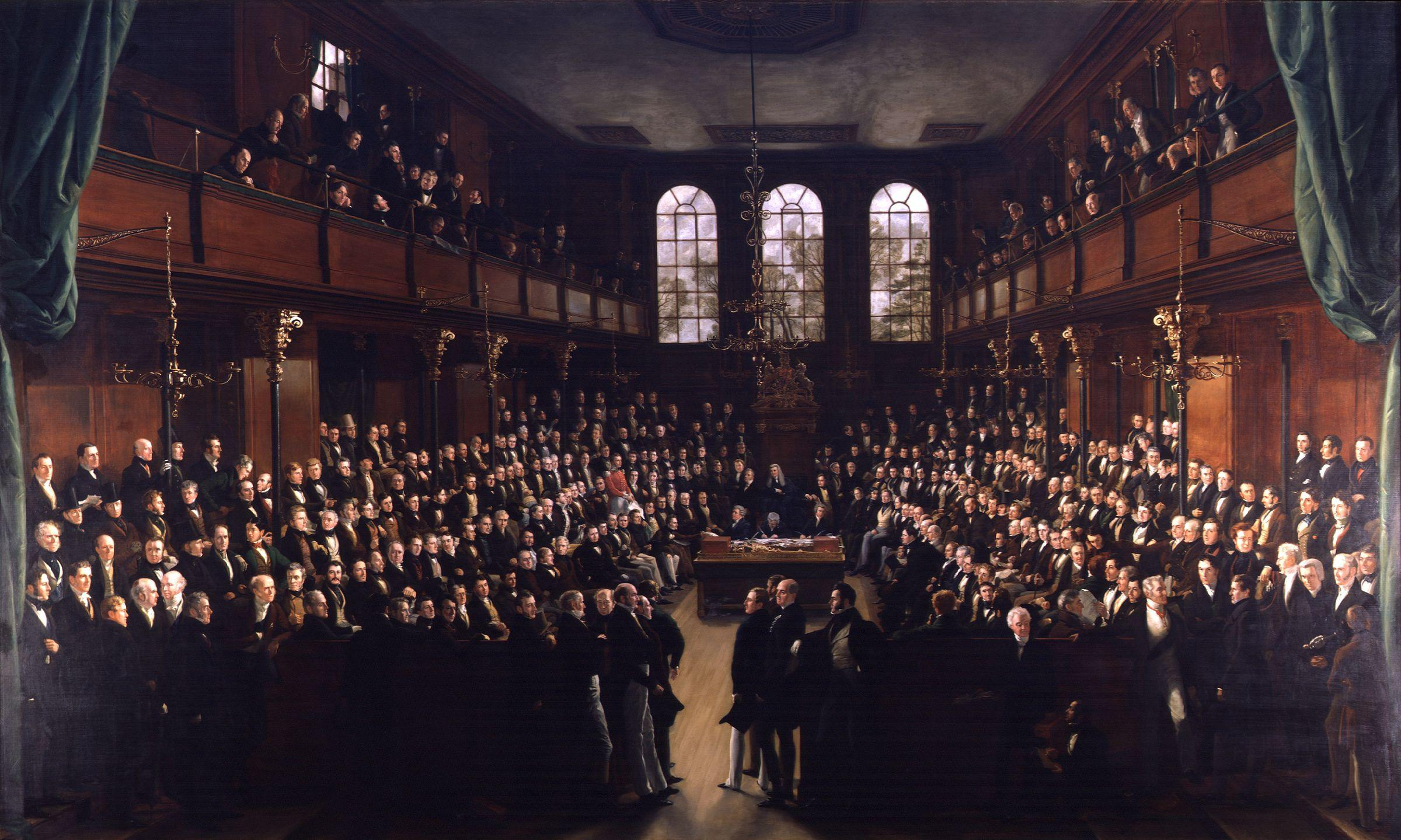
- The House of Commons, 1833 by Sir George Hayter

Member of Parliament for Southwark
- In office 12 December 1832 – 9 July 1852 Serving with William Molesworth (1845–1852); Benjamin Wood (1840–1845); Daniel Whittle Harvey (1835–1840); William Brougham (1832–1835)
- Preceded by: William Brougham; Charles Calvert
- Succeeded by: William Molesworth; Apsley Pellatt

Personal details
- Born: c. 1794
- Died: 28 September 1863
- Party: Whig

John Humphery (c. 1794 – 28 September 1863) was a British Whig politician.

Humphery became a Whig MP for Southwark in the 1832 general election and held the seat until the 1852 general election, when he did not seek re-election.

Parliament of the United Kingdom
Preceded by William Brougham; Charles Calvert	Member of Parliament for Southwark; 1832–1852; With: William Molesworth (1845–1852); Benjamin Wood (1840–1845); Daniel Whittle Harvey (1835–1840); William Brougham (1832–1835)	Succeeded by William Molesworth; Apsley Pellatt
