= Thorold Rogers =

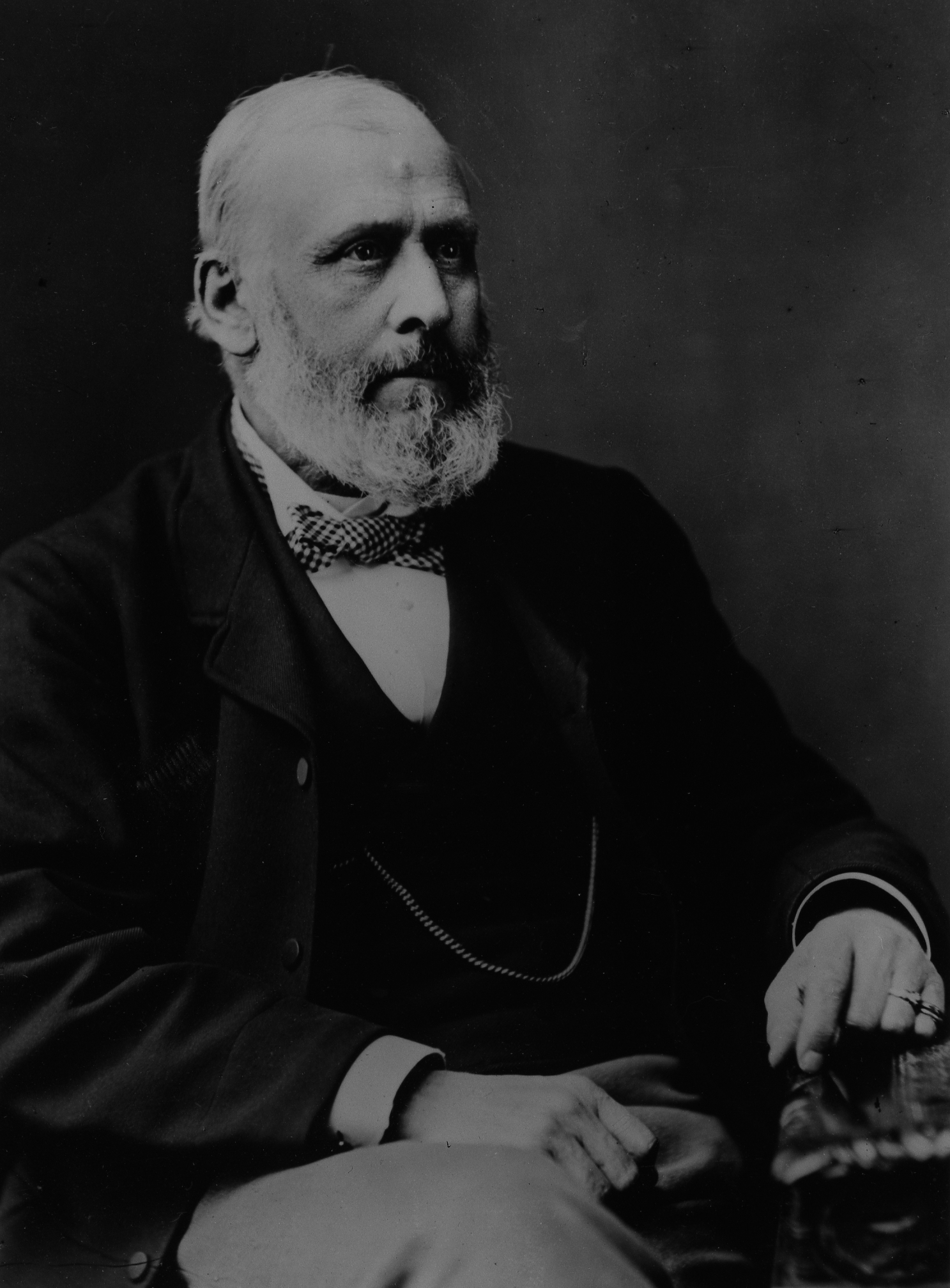
- Born: 23 March 1823; West Meon, Hampshire, England
- Died: 14 October 1890 (aged 67); Oxford, England

Academic background
- Education: King's College London; University of Oxford

Academic work
- Discipline: Political Economy
- School or tradition: English historical school

James Edwin Thorold Rogers (23 March 1823 – 14 October 1890), known as Thorold Rogers, was an English economist, historian and Liberal politician who sat in the House of Commons from 1880 to 1886. He deployed historical and statistical methods to analyse some of the key economic and social questions in Victorian England. As an advocate of free trade and social justice, he distinguished himself from some others within the English Historical School.

== Background and formative years ==
Rogers was born at West Meon, Hampshire, the son of George Vining Rogers and his wife Mary Ann Blyth, daughter of John Blyth. He was educated at King's College London and Magdalen Hall, Oxford. After taking a first-class degree in 1846, he received his MA in 1849 from Magdalen and was ordained. A High Church man, he was curate of St. Paul's in Oxford, and acted voluntarily as assistant curate at Headington from 1854 to 1858, until his views changed and he turned to politics. Rogers was instrumental in obtaining the Clerical Disabilities Act 1870 (33 & 34 Vict. c. 91), of which he was the first beneficiary, becoming the first man legally to withdraw from his clerical vows in 1870.

For some time the classics were the chief field of his activity. He devoted himself to classical and philosophical tuition in Oxford with success, and his publications included an edition of Aristotle's Ethics (in 1865).

== Anecdotes ==
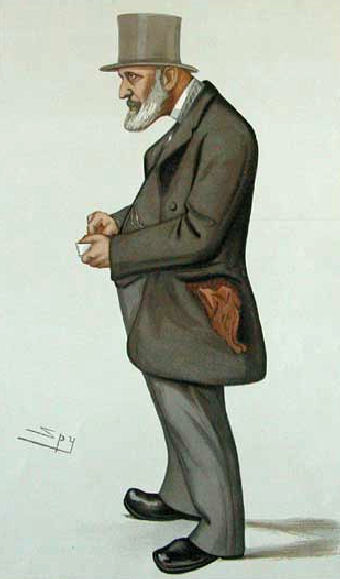
Rogers caricature by Leslie Ward from Vanity Fair

The Victorian journalist George W. E. Russell (1853–1919) relates an exchange between Rogers and Benjamin Jowett (Fifteen Chapters of Autobiography, 1914, 111–2) :

'Another of our Professors – J. E. Thorold Rogers – though perhaps scarcely a celebrity, was well known outside Oxford, partly because he was the first person to relinquish the clerical character under the Act of 1870, partly because of his really learned labours in history and economics, and partly because of his Rabelaisian humour. He was fond of writing sarcastic epigrams, and of reciting them to his friends, and this habit produced a characteristic retort from Jowett. Rogers had only an imperfect sympathy with the historians of the new school, and thus derided the mutual admiration of Green and Freeman —

"Where, ladling butter from a large tureen,
See blustering Freeman butter blundering Green."

To which Jowett replied, in his quavering treble, "That's a false antithesis, Rogers. It's quite possible to bluster and blunder, too!"'

== Political economy ==
Simultaneously with these occupations he had been studying economics. He became the first Tooke Professor of Statistics and Economic Science at King's College London, serving in this role from 1859 until his death. During this time he also held the Drummond professorship of political economy at All Souls College, Oxford from 1862 until 1867, when Bonamy Price was elected in his stead. In this he became a friend and follower of Richard Cobden, an advocate for free trade, non-intervention in Europe and an end to imperial expansion, whom he met during his first tenure as Drummond professor. Rogers said of Cobden, "he knew that ... political economy ... was, or ought to be, eminently inductive, and that an economist without facts is like an engineer without materials or tools." Rogers had a wealth of facts at his disposal: his most influential works were the 6-volume History of Agriculture and Prices in England from 1259 to 1795 and Six Centuries of Work and Wages; he spent 20 years collecting facts for the latter work.

He served as President of the first day of the 1875 Co-operative Congress. He was elected Liberal Member of Parliament (MP) for Southwark in 1880 and held the seat until it was divided under the Redistribution of Seats Act 1885. At the 1885 general election he was elected MP for Bermondsey and held the seat until 1886. Rogers also lectured in political economy at Worcester College, Oxford in 1883 and was re-elected Drummond professor in 1888.

== Works ==
- A History of Agriculture and Prices in England from 1259 to 1793 (1866–1902), 7 vols. I, II (1866), III, IV (1882), V, VI (1887), VII, Part I, VII, Part II (1902)
- Speeches on questions of public policy by John Bright, M.P. Preface by James E. Thorold Rogers, editor. 2 vols. London: Macmillan and Co. (1868)
- Adam Smith, An Inquiry into the Nature and Causes of the Wealth of Nations, editor. 2 vols. (1869); revised edition (1880); on line at Osmania University, Digital Library of India, Internet Archive. Preface by Thorold Rogers pp. v–xxx1x and v. II (1869)
- Historical Gleanings, A Series of Sketches (Montagu, Walpole, Adam Smith, Cobbett), London : Macmillan (1869)
- Speeches on Questions of Public Policy by Richard Cobden, M.P., Edited by John Bright and James E. Thorold Rogers, London, T. Fisher Unwin (1870). Preface by Thorold Rogers. v. 1 ISBN 1-84702-915-9 v. 2 ISBN 1-4254-9223-1; third ed. (1908) on line at Library of Economics and Liberty
- Cobden and Modern Political Opinion. Essays on certain political topics, London, Macmillan (1873) on line.
- A Complete Collection of the Protests of the Lords: With Historical Introductions, Vol. 1 1624–1741. Oxford, Clarendon Press; London, Macmillan & Co. (1875) On line. vol. 2. 1741–1825; vol. 3. 1826–1874.
- Public Addresses by John Bright, M.P., ed. James E. Thorold Rogers, Preface by Thorold Rogers, pp. v–xi. 2nd ed., revised. London, Macmillan (1879) On line.
- Six Centuries of Work and Wages: The History of English Labour 2 vols. London, Swan Sonnenschein (1884) ISBN 0-415-38229-7 – McMaster. On line.
- The First Nine Years of the Bank of England, London, Macmillan (1887) Internet Archive, on line.
- The Relations of Economic Science to Social and Political Action. London: Swan Sonnenschein (1888).
- The Economic Interpretation of History London, G.P. Putnam's Sons (1888); T. Fisher Unwin (1909).
- Holland. London, T. Fisher Unwin (1888); New York, G.P. Putnam's Sons (1889)
- The Industrial and Commercial History of England: Lectures Delivered to the University of Oxford, ed. Arthur G. L. Rogers. New York, G. P. Putnam, 1892. Google Books, on line.

== Family ==
Rogers married Ann Susannah Charlotte Reynolds, daughter of Henry Revell Reynolds, Treasury Solicitor, in December 1854. They had a daughter, Annie Mary Anne Henley Rogers, who was an active supporter of the Liberal party, higher education for women and women's suffrage. Between December 1850 and January 1853 (her death), he had been married to Anna, only daughter of William Peskett, surgeon, of Petersfield, Hampshire.

== Notes ==
Parliament of the United Kingdom
Preceded by Edward Clarke; Marcus Beresford	Member of Parliament for Southwark; 1880–1885; With: Arthur Cohen	Constituency abolished
New constituency	Member of Parliament for Bermondsey; 1885–1886	Succeeded by Alfred Lafone
