= William Derby (fl. 1397) =

William Derby (fl. 1397) was a Member of Parliament for Southwark in September 1397.
