= William Wilson (died 1582) =

English politician

William Wilson (died 1582) was an English politician.

He was a member (MP) of the parliament of England for Southwark in 1571.
