= John Locke (MP) =

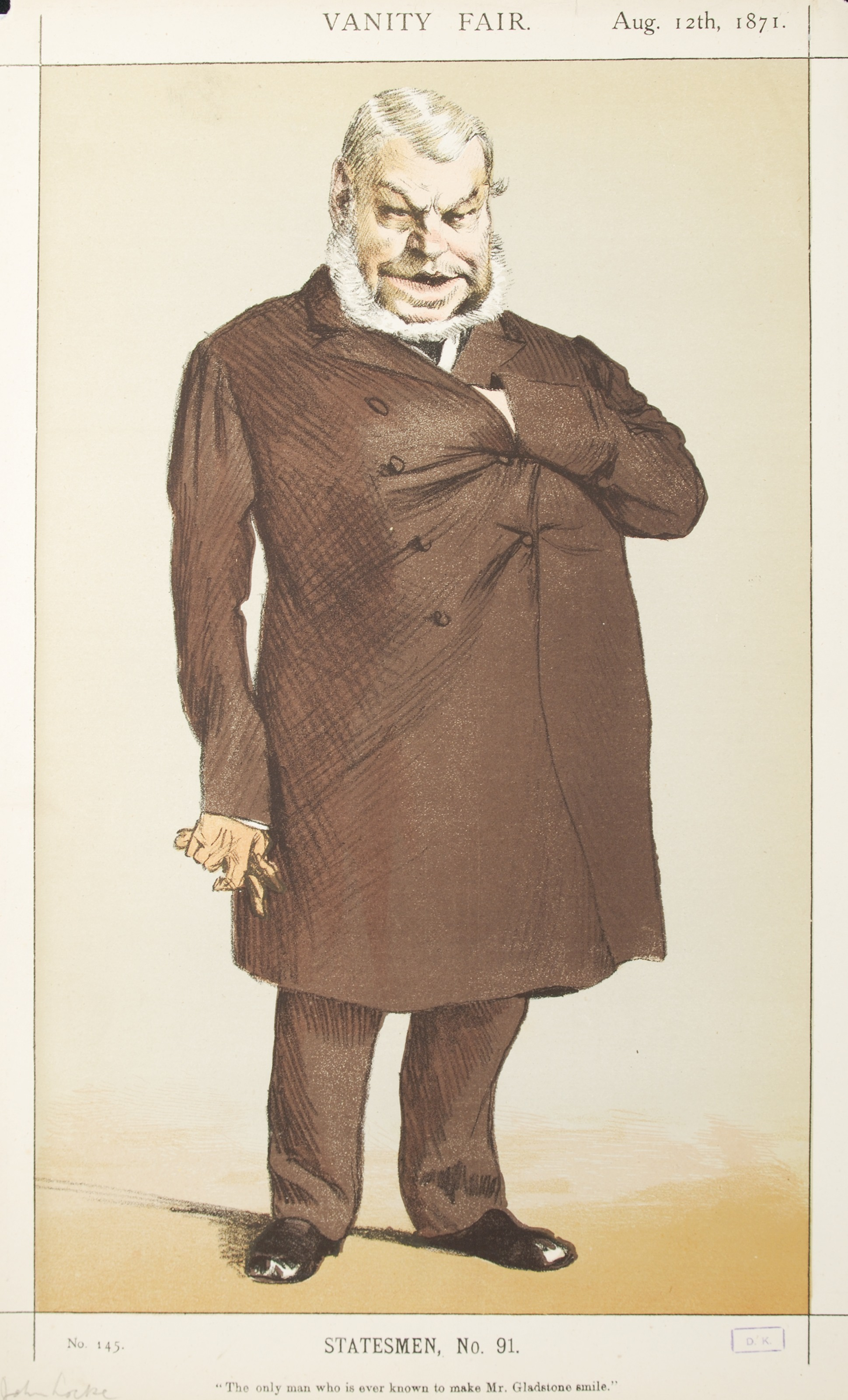
"The only man who is ever known to make Mr Gladstone smile" Locke as caricatured by James Tissot in Vanity Fair, August 1871

John Locke (1805 – 28 January 1880) was an English barrister, author and Liberal Party politician.

The only son of John Locke, a surveyor of Herne Hill, he was educated at Dulwich College. Reading law at Trinity College, Cambridge, he left with an MA in 1832 and was called to the Bar from the Inner Temple in 1833.

Between 1845 and 1857 he was a common pleader of the City of London, and counsel to the Inland Revenue. He was elected as the Member of Parliament (MP) for Southwark at the general election in April 1857, and held the seat until his death. He was mainly active in causes for the working class and local government, introducing a bill that give witnesses in criminal cases the right to affirm as in civil cases.

He died in February 1880 and was buried in the catacombs at West Norwood Cemetery.

== Sources ==
- Locke, John (1805–1880), J. A. Hamilton, rev. H. C. G. Matthew, Oxford Dictionary of National Biography

Parliament of the United Kingdom
Preceded by Apsley Pellatt; Sir Charles Napier	Member of Parliament for Southwark; 1857 – 1880; With: Sir Charles Napier to 1860; Austen Henry Layard 1860–1870; Marcus Beresford from 1870	Succeeded by Edward Clarke; Marcus Beresford (1818–1890)
