= Apsley Pellatt (1763–1826) =

English glass manufacturer

Apsley Pellatt (1763 – 21 January 1826) was an English glass manufacturer.

== Life ==
Apsley Pellatt (junior) was the son of Apsley Pellatt (senior) (1736–1798), of Lewes, Sussex, and of St Margaret's, Westminster, and Sarah, daughter of Thomas Meriton, of Bermondsey, Surrey. At St Andrews church, Holborn, London on 20 March 1788 he married Mary Maberly (1768–1822), daughter of prosperous manufacturer Stephen Maberly and sister of John Maberly. They had 15 children, of whom Apsley Pellatt (III) was the eldest son. Pellatt lived at The Friars, Lewes, and ran his business at St Paul's Churchyard, London.

Sometime around 1790 he bought the Falcon Glass House in Blackfriars, London which had been making glass since 1693. In 1807 he took out a patent for the manufacture of lights (round lens-shaped windows like portholes) to allow natural light to illuminate the interiors of dark rooms, especially the holds of ships.

Banking records at C. Hoare & Co show extensive and regular deposits made to chemist and mineralogist James Smithson, suggesting a strong financial or scientific relationship with the Blackfriars glass maker. James Smithson#Scientific work

His eldest son Apsley (III) joined the business in 1811 and took it over completely on Apsley's (junior) death in 1826, renaming it Apsley Pellatt & Co. A younger son, Frederic, also joined the company in due course. Apsley (junior) was buried with his wife in the Cribbe family vault in Bunhill Fields, London.

Pellatt's third son, Mill Pellatt (1795–1863), was grandfather of the Canadian financier Sir Henry Pellatt.
