= Arthur Cohen (politician) =

English barrister and politician (1830–1914)

The Right Honourable Arthur Cohen
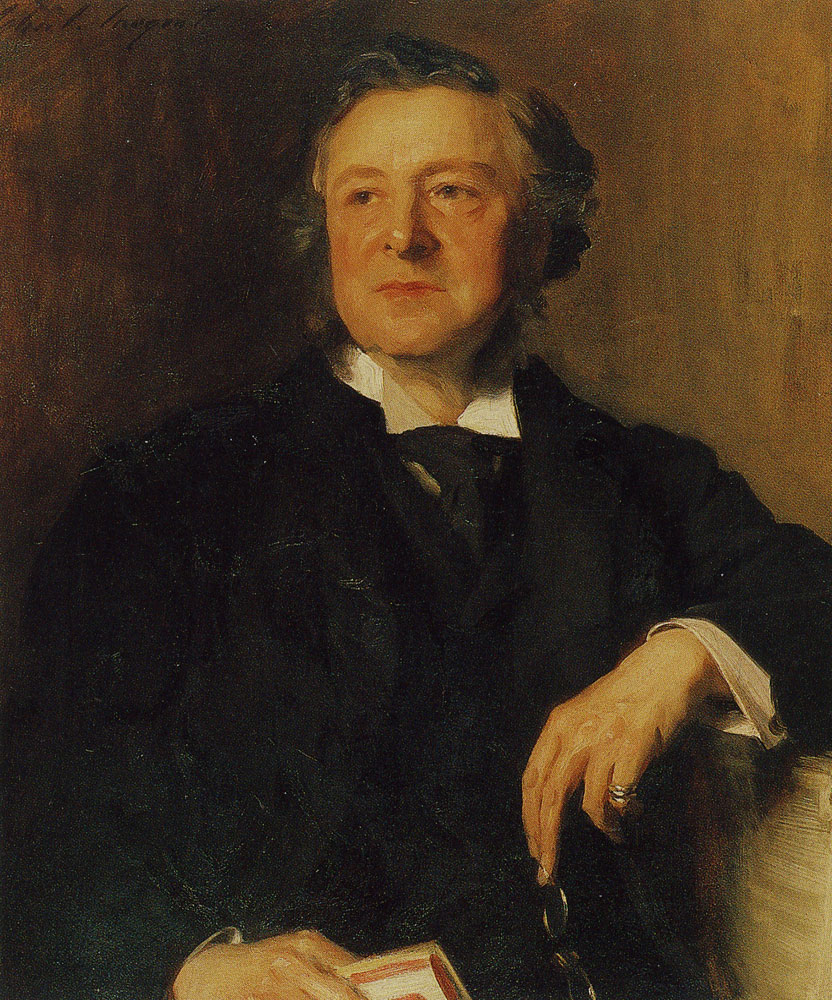
- Portrait by John Singer Sargent.

Member of the British Parliament for Southwark
- In office 1880–1885

Member of the British Parliament for Southwark West
- In office 1885–1888

Judge of the Admiralty court of Cinque Ports
- In office 1875–1914

Personal details
- Born: 18 November 1829 Wyndham Place, London, UK
- Died: 3 November 1914 (aged 84) Hyde Park, London, UK
- Party: Liberal Party
- Spouse: Emmeline Micholls
- Children: 8
- Parents: Benjamin Cohen (father); Justina Montefiore (mother)
- Education: Magdalene College, Cambridge
- Occupation: barrister and politician

Arthur Cohen, KC, FBA (18 November 1829 – 3 November 1914) was an English barrister and Liberal Party politician.

== Biography ==
He was born in Wyndham Place, Bryanston Square, London, the youngest son of Benjamin Cohen, a prosperous bill broker. His grandfather, Levy Barent Cohen, had moved from Holland. His mother, Justina, was the sister of Sir Moses Montefiore.

After three years' study at the gymnasium in Frankfurt-on-the-Main, he entered as a student at University College London. He proceeded to Cambridge University at a time when it was almost impossible for a Jew to gain admission into the colleges. In 1849, he was received into Magdalene College, Cambridge to read Mathematics. In 1853 he was president of the Cambridge Union Society. At Cambridge Cohen had a successful career, coming out fifth wrangler in the Mathematical tripos. As a Jew he could not take his degree until after the passing of the Cambridge University Act 1856 (19 & 20 Vict. c. 88), which abolished the obligatory Christian oath which had preceded graduation. In 1858 Cohen became the first professing Jew to graduate at Cambridge, taking his MA in 1860.

Cohen then read law and was called to the bar in 1857. He established for himself a reputation in shipping and insurance cases. Among several important appointments was his selection to represent the interests of England in the famous arbitration case (Alabama Claims) connected with the CSS Alabama at Geneva in 1872. He was for many years after 1876 standing counsel for his university. He often represented foreign governments in disputes before the English law courts, as, for example, the Japanese government in an important case against P&O.

Cohen in 1874 unsuccessfully contested Lewes in the Liberal interest. In 1880, he was elected for the Southwark division, and shortly afterward in February 1881, was offered a judgeship, which he declined, Gladstone not wishing to trigger a risky by-election. The offer was never renewed. In 1905, he was sworn of the Privy Council. He served as counsel for the Indian Office from 1893 to 1914, and was also counsel in an arbitration at The Hague and chaired the Bar Council.

On his death, A. V. Dicey wrote that "The death of Arthur Cohen has robbed the Bar of one of its glories. He came as near as a man could to the ideal of an English lawyer. This assertion may no doubt appear to the ordinary public to savour of exaggeration. But it is in reality the simplest statement of an indubitable fact."

Cohen held various important positions in the London Jewish community. For many years he was president of the Board of Deputies, succeeding his uncle, Sir Moses Montefiore; but he resigned the position in 1894. He was a vice-president of Jews' College, and for many years president of the borough Jewish schools.

In 1860, he married Emmeline, daughter of Henry Micholls. They had eight children. Their daughter Margaret married the educationalist Sir Theodore Morison.

== Bibliography ==
- Young Israel, ii., No. 13
- People of the Period, 1897
- Jewish Year Book, 1901–02
- Dictionary of National Biography

Parliament of the United Kingdom
Preceded by Edward Clarke; Marcus Beresford	Member of Parliament for Southwark; 1880 – 1885; With: Thorold Rogers	Constituency abolished
New constituency	Member of Parliament for Southwark West; 1885 – 1888	Succeeded by Richard Causton
