= John Northampton (Southwark MP) =

John Northampton (died 1390 or after) was an English Member of Parliament (MP).

He was a Member of the Parliament of England for Southwark in February 1388.
