= Trial of the Detectives =

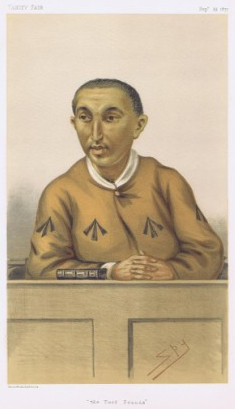
Harry Benson by Vanity Fair

The Trial of the Detectives (also known as the Turf Fraud Scandal) was a police corruption scandal involving three senior Metropolitan Police officers in 1877.

The Metropolitan Police's Detective Branch was tasked with investigating a confidence trick carried out by Harry Benson and William Kurr, both Englishmen, who used horse racing bets to swindle £30,000 from Madame de Goncourt, a Parisian woman. The pursuit and capture of Benson and Kurr proved to be a complicated task as they always managed to stay one step ahead of the authorities. The subsequent investigation uncovered that Inspector John Meiklejohn had been accepting bribes from Kurr to provide advance warning of their impending arrest. Additionally, Chief Inspector Nathaniel Druscovich and Chief Inspector William Palmer were implicated in this corrupt scheme.

The three stood trial at the Old Bailey alongside solicitor Edward Froggatt and Chief Inspector George Clarke, also a Metropolitan Police detective. Clarke was found Not Guilty but the other four were sentenced to two years in prison. The incident had implications for the organisation of Scotland Yard, as the Superintendent's ability to supervise his subordinates was called into question. Following the Committee of Inquiry, the Detective Branch was reorganised into the CID.
