= Southwark (UK Parliament constituency) =

Parliamentary constituency in the United Kingdom, 1950–1974

- Former borough constituency for the House of Commons
- County: London

1295–1885
- Seats: Two
- Created from: Surrey (part of)
- Replaced by: Bermondsey; Rotherhithe; Southwark West

1950–1974
- Seats: One
- Created from: Southwark Central, Southwark North and Southwark South East
- Replaced by: Bermondsey (abolished 1983); Peckham (abolished 1997); Dulwich (absorbed small parts) (abolished 1997)

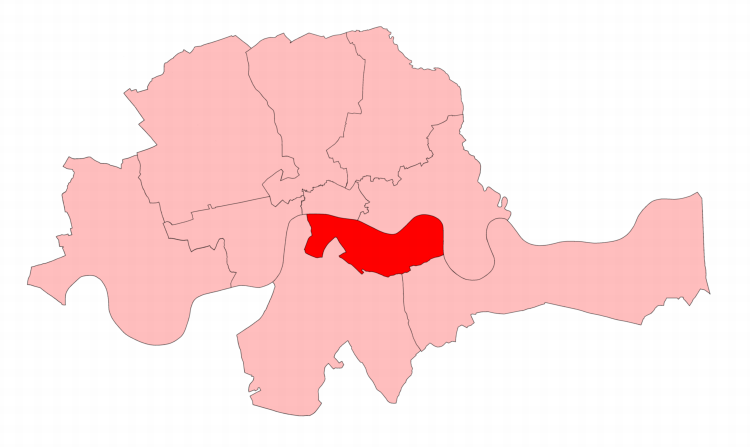
Southwark in London, 1868–85

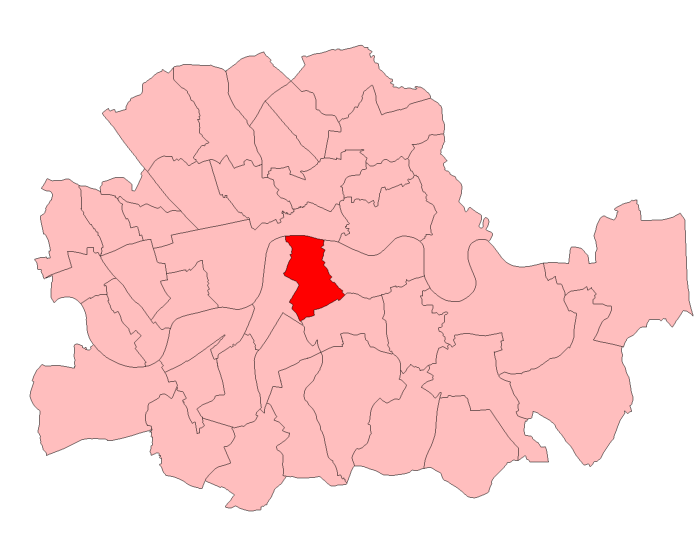
Southwark in London, 1950–74

Southwark (/ˈsʌðərk/ SUDH-ərk) was a constituency centred on the Southwark district of South London. It returned two Members of Parliament to the House of Commons of the English Parliament from 1295 to 1707, to the Parliament of Great Britain from 1707 to 1800, and to the UK Parliament until its first abolition for the 1885 general election. A seat of the same name, covering a smaller area than the last form of the earlier seat in the west of the original and beyond its boundaries to the southwest, was created in 1950 and abolished in 1974.

In its last creation the seat's broad electorate heavily supported the three successive Labour candidates, who won Southwark with a majority of greater than 36% of the votes cast at its eight elections – an extremely safe seat.

== Creation, boundaries, abolition ==
First creation – or Southwark dual-member constituency

The constituency was created in 1295 as a parliamentary borough (also known as burgh) when its electorate was restricted to the owners of certain properties in its main streets of its burgage, returning two 'burgesses' as they were sometimes called. Its electorate was expanded to a more standard franchise in 1832. In 1833 the electorate was 4,775 adult males and this had risen to 23,472 by 1880.

The Redistribution of Seats Act 1885 replaced the two-member constituency with the seats West Southwark, Rotherhithe and Bermondsey.

Second creation – or Southwark seat

A seat taking the old constituency name was established for the 1950 general election. Its boundaries were unaltered in the 1955 corrective review and it was abolished for the February 1974 general election.

== Members of Parliament ==
=== MPs 1295–1640 ===
Parliament	First member	Second member
1386	Henry Thymelby	William Beeche
1388 (Feb)	John Northampton	William Porter
1388 (Sep)	Roger Chandler	Richard atte Vine
1390 (Jan)	William Wintringham	John Mucking
1390 (Nov)
1391	William Spalding	Walter Segrave
1393	John Solas	Thomas Solas
1394
1395	John Solas	John Mucking
1397 (Jan)	Thomas atte Gill	John Mucking
1397 (Sep)	William Derby	John Mucking
1399	Ralph Spalding	John Parker
1401
1402	John Gofaire	John Mucking
1404 (Jan)
1404 (Oct)
1406	John Baker	Thomas Spencer
1407	Thomas Colman	John Deken
1410		
1411		
1413 (Feb)
1413 (May)	William Horton	Thomas Spencer
1414 (Apr)	John William	John Welles
1414 (Nov)	John Solas	William Kirton
1415	William Redstone	Thomas Spencer
1416 (Mar)	John Solas	John Mucking
1416 (Oct)
1417	William Kirton	John Deken
1419	Robert William	John Welles
1420	William Kirton	John Deken
1421 (May)	William Redstone	John Deken
1421 (Dec)	Thomas Dewy	Thomas Lucas
1510–1523	No names known	
1529	Sir John Shilston, died 1530	Robert Acton
1536	Thomas Bulla	?
1539	Sir Richard Long	Robert Acton
1542	Robert Acton	Thomas Bulla
1545	?	William Gyllam
1547	Sir John Gates, repl. by Jan 1552 by John Sayer	Richard Fulmerston
1553 (Mar)	John Eston	John Sayer
1553 (Oct)	Humphrey Colet	John Sayer
1554 (Apr)	John Eston	John Sayer
1554 (Nov)	John Eston	John Sayer
1555	John Eston	Humphrey Colet
1558	John Eston	Robert Freeman
1559	John Eston	Robert Freeman
1562–3	Thomas Cure	Oliffe Burr
1571	Thomas Cure	William Wilson
1572	Oliffe Burr	Thomas Way
1584	Thomas Way	Richard Hutton
1586	Thomas Cure	Richard Hutton
1588–9	Richard Hutton	William Pratt
1593	Hugh Browker	Richard Hutton
1597	Edmund Bowyer	Richard Hutton
1601	Mathew Dale	Zachariah Locke
1604–1611	Sir George Rivers	William Counden
1614	Edward Coxe	Richard Yarward
1621	Richard Yarward	Robert Bromfield
1624	Richard Yarward	Robert Bromfield
1625	Richard Yarward	William Coxe
1626	Richard Yarward	William Coxe
1628	Richard Yarward	William Coxe
1629–1640	No Parliaments summoned	

=== MPs 1640–1885 ===
Election	First Member	First Party	Second Member	Second Party
April 1640	Robert Holborne		Richard Tuffnell	
November 1640	Edward Bagshawe	Royalist	John White	Parliamentarian
January 1644	Bagshawe disabled from sitting – seat vacant		John White	Parliamentarian
1645	George Thomson		George Snelling	
1653	Southwark was unrepresented in the Barebones Parliament			
1654	Samuel Highland		Robert Warcup	
1656	Samuel Highland		Peter De La Noy	
January 1659	George Thomson		Andrew Brewer	
April 1660	John Langham		Sir Thomas Bludworth	
1661	George Moore		Sir Thomas Bludworth	
1666	Sir Thomas Clarges		Sir Thomas Bludworth	
1679	Sir Richard How		Peter Rich	
1685	Sir Peter Daniel		Anthony Bowyer	
1689	John Arnold		Sir Peter Rich	
1690	John Arnold		Anthony Bowyer	
1695	Sir Charles Cox	Whig	Anthony Bowyer	
1698	Sir Charles Cox	Whig	John Cholmley	Whig
January 1712	Sir Charles Cox	Whig	Edmund Halsey	
February 1712	Sir Charles Cox	Whig	Sir George Matthews	
1713	John Lade	Tory	Fisher Tench	Whig
1722	George Meggott		Edmund Halsey	Whig
1724 by-election	John Lade	Tory	Edmund Halsey	Whig
1727	Sir Joseph Eyles	Whig	Edmund Halsey	Whig
1730 by-election	Sir Joseph Eyles	Whig	Thomas Inwen	
1734	George Heathcote	Tory	Thomas Inwen	
1741	Ralph Thrale		Thomas Inwen	
1743 by-election	Ralph Thrale		Alexander Hume	
1747	William Belchier		Alexander Hume	
1754	William Belchier		William Hammond	
1761	Joseph Mawbey		Alexander Hume	
1765 by-election	Joseph Mawbey		Henry Thrale	Pro-Government Chathamite/Northite
1774	Nathaniel Polhill	Radical	Henry Thrale	Pro-Government Chathamite/Northite
1780	Nathaniel Polhill	Radical	Sir Richard Hotham	
1782 by-election	Henry Thornton	Tory	Sir Richard Hotham	
April 1784	Henry Thornton	Tory	Sir Barnard Turner	Independent
June 1784 by-election	Henry Thornton	Tory	Paul Le Mesurier	Tory
May 1796	Henry Thornton	Tory	George Woodford Thellusson	Tory
December 1796 by-election	Henry Thornton	Tory	George Tierney	Whig
1806	Henry Thornton	Tory	Sir Thomas Turton, Bt	Tory
1812	Henry Thornton	Tory	Charles Calvert	Whig
1815 by-election	Charles Barclay	Tory	Charles Calvert	Whig
1818	Sir Robert Wilson	Radical	Charles Calvert	Whig
Aug 1830	Sir Robert Wilson	Radical	John Rawlinson Harris	Whig
Nov 1830 by-election	Sir Robert Wilson	Radical	Charles Calvert	Whig
1831	William Brougham	Whig	Charles Calvert	Whig
1832	William Brougham	Whig	John Humphery	Whig
1835	Daniel Whittle Harvey	Radical	John Humphery	Whig
1840 by-election	Benjamin Wood	Whig	John Humphery	Whig
1845 by-election	Sir William Molesworth	Radical	John Humphery	Whig
1852	Sir William Molesworth	Radical	Apsley Pellatt	Radical
1855 by-election	Sir Charles Napier	Radical	Apsley Pellatt	Radical
1857	Sir Charles Napier	Radical	John Locke	Radical
1859	Sir Charles Napier	Liberal	John Locke	Liberal
1860 by-election	Austen Henry Layard	Liberal	John Locke	Liberal
1870 by-election	Marcus Beresford	Conservative	John Locke	Liberal
1880 by-election	Marcus Beresford	Conservative	Edward Clarke	Conservative
1880	Arthur Cohen	Liberal	Thorold Rogers	Liberal
1885	constituency abolished: creating all of Bermondsey, Rotherhithe and Southwark West			

=== MPs 1950–1974 ===
Election	Member	Party
1950	George Isaacs	Labour
1959	Ray Gunter	Labour
1972 by-election	Harry Lamborn	Labour
Feb 1974	constituency abolished	

== Election results ==
=== Elections in the 1830s ===
General election 1830: Southwark
Party	Candidate	Votes	%	±%
Whig	John Rawlinson Harris	1,664	40.7	
Radical	Robert Wilson	1,434	35.0	
Whig	Charles Calvert	995	24.3	
Majority		230	5.7	
Whig hold		Swing		
Majority		439	10.7	
Turnout		2,635		
Radical hold		Swing		

Harris' death caused a by-election.

By-election November 1830: Southwark
Party	Candidate	Votes	%	±%
Whig	Charles Calvert	1,066	62.4	−2.6
Tory	Thomas Farncomb	643	37.6	New
Majority		423	24.8	+19.1
Turnout		1,709		
Whig hold		Swing		

General election 1831: Southwark
Party	Candidate	Votes	%	±%
Whig	Charles Calvert	Unopposed		
Whig	William Brougham	Unopposed		
Whig hold				
Whig gain from Radical				

General election 1832: Southwark
Party	Candidate	Votes	%	±%
Whig	William Brougham	2,264	45.2	N/A
Whig	John Humphery	1,708	34.1	N/A
Whig	Lancelot Baugh Allen	1,040	20.8	N/A
Radical	Thomas Lamie Murray	0	0.0	New
Majority		668	13.3	N/A
Turnout		2,810	58.8	N/A
Registered electors		4,775		
Whig hold		Swing	N/A	
Whig hold		Swing	N/A	

General election 1835: Southwark
Party	Candidate	Votes	%	±%
Whig	John Humphery	Unopposed		
Radical	Daniel Whittle Harvey	Unopposed		
Registered electors		5,249		
Whig hold				
Radical gain from Whig				

General election 1837: Southwark
Party	Candidate	Votes	%	±%
Whig	John Humphery	1,941	41.1	N/A
Radical	Daniel Whittle Harvey	1,927	40.9	N/A
Conservative	John Richards	847	18.0	New
Conservative	Benjamin Harrison	2	0.0	New
Turnout		2,898	52.9	N/A
Registered electors		5,477		
Majority		14	0.2	N/A
Whig hold		Swing	N/A	
Majority		1,080	22.9	N/A
Radical hold		Swing	N/A	

Harvey was appointed a registrar of Metropolitan Public Carriages, causing a by-election.

By-election, 27 February 1839: Southwark
Party	Candidate	Votes	%	±%
Radical	Daniel Whittle Harvey	Unopposed		
Radical hold				

=== Elections in the 1840s ===
Harvey resigned after being appointed a Commissioner of Police for the City of London, causing a by-election.

By-election, 24 January 1840: Southwark
Party	Candidate	Votes	%	±%
Whig	Benjamin Wood	2,059	57.3	+16.2
Conservative	John Walter	1,535	42.7	+24.7
Majority		524	14.6	+14.3
Turnout		3,594	71.2	+18.3
Registered electors		5,047		
Whig gain from Radical		Swing	−4.3	

General election 1841: Southwark (2 seats)
Party	Candidate	Votes	%	±%
Whig	John Humphery	Unopposed		
Whig	Benjamin Wood	Unopposed		
Registered electors		5,124		
Whig hold				
Whig hold				

Wood's death caused a by-election.

By-election, 12 September 1845: Southwark
Party	Candidate	Votes	%	±%
Radical	William Molesworth	1,943	55.9	N/A
Conservative	Jeremiah Pilcher	1,182	34.0	New
Radical	Edward Miall	352	10.1	N/A
Majority		761	21.9	N/A
Turnout		3,477	65.0	N/A
Registered electors		5,353		
Radical gain from Whig		Swing	N/A	

General election 1847: Southwark (2 seats)
Party	Candidate	Votes	%	±%
Whig	John Humphery	Unopposed		
Radical	William Molesworth	Unopposed		
Registered electors		7,989		
Whig hold				
Radical gain from Whig				

=== Elections in the 1850s ===
General election 1852: Southwark (2 seats)
Party	Candidate	Votes	%	±%
Radical	William Molesworth	3,941	36.7	N/A
Radical	Apsley Pellatt	3,887	36.2	N/A
Radical	George Scovell	2,909	27.1	N/A
Majority		978	9.1	N/A
Turnout		5,369 (est)	56.8 (est)	N/A
Registered electors		9,458		
Radical hold				
Radical gain from Whig				

Molesworth was appointed First Commissioner of Works, requiring a by-election.

By-election, 1 January 1853: Southwark
Party	Candidate	Votes	%	±%
Radical	William Molesworth	Unopposed		
Radical hold				

Molesworth was appointed Secretary of State for the Colonies, requiring a by-election.

By-election, 27 July 1855: Southwark
Party	Candidate	Votes	%	±%
Radical	William Molesworth	Unopposed		
Radical hold				

Molesworth's death caused a by-election.

By-election, 20 November 1855: Southwark
Party	Candidate	Votes	%	±%
Radical	Charles Napier	Unopposed		
Radical hold				

General election 1857: Southwark (2 seats)
Party	Candidate	Votes	%	±%
Radical	Charles Napier	3,991	39.4	+2.7
Radical	John Locke	3,647	36.0	N/A
Radical	Apsley Pellatt	2,499	24.7	−11.5
Majority		1,148	11.3	+2.2
Turnout		5,069 (est)	49.8 (est)	−7.0
Registered electors		10,170		
Radical hold				
Radical hold				

General election 1859: Southwark (2 seats)
Party	Candidate	Votes	%	±%
Liberal	Charles Napier	4,446	38.9	−0.5
Liberal	John Locke	4,255	37.2	+1.2
Liberal	Apsley Pellatt	2,730	23.9	−0.8
Majority		1,525	13.3	+2.0
Turnout		5,716 (est)	53.9 (est)	+4.1
Registered electors		10,606		
Liberal hold				
Liberal hold				

=== Elections in the 1860s ===
Napier's death caused a by-election.

By-election, 12 December 1860: Southwark
Party	Candidate	Votes	%	±%
Liberal	Austen Henry Layard	4,572	57.5	N/A
Liberal	George Scovell	3,377	42.5	N/A
Majority		1,195	15.0	+1.7
Turnout		7,949	70.5	+16.6
Registered electors		11,278		
Liberal hold		Swing	N/A	

Locke was appointed Recorder of Brighton, requiring a by-election.

By-election, 24 April 1861: Southwark
Party	Candidate	Votes	%	±%
Liberal	John Locke	Unopposed		
Liberal hold				

General election 1865: Southwark (2 seats)
Party	Candidate	Votes	%	±%
Liberal	John Locke	Unopposed		
Liberal	Austen Henry Layard	Unopposed		
Registered electors		11,631		
Liberal hold				
Liberal hold				

General election 1868: Southwark (2 seats)
Party	Candidate	Votes	%	±%
Liberal	John Locke	6,027	41.8	N/A
Liberal	Austen Henry Layard	5,908	40.9	N/A
Conservative	William Cotton	2,495	17.3	New
Majority		3,413	23.6	N/A
Turnout		8,463 (est)	47.8 (est)	N/A
Registered electors		17,703		
Liberal hold		Swing	N/A	
Liberal hold		Swing	N/A	

Layard was appointed First Commissioner of Works, requiring a by-election.

By-election, 21 December 1868: Southwark
Party	Candidate	Votes	%	±%
Liberal	Austen Henry Layard	Unopposed		
Liberal hold				

=== Elections in the 1870s ===
Layard resigned after being appointed British ambassador to Spain.

By-election, 17 Feb 1870: Southwark (1 seat)
Party	Candidate	Votes	%	±%
Conservative	Marcus Beresford	4,686	38.9	+21.6
Lib-Lab	George Odger	4,382	36.4	New
Liberal	Sydney Waterlow	2,966	24.6	−58.1
Majority		304	2.5	N/A
Turnout		12,034	68.0	+20.2
Registered electors		17,703		
Conservative gain from Liberal		Swing	+39.9	

General election 1874: Southwark (2 seats)
Party	Candidate	Votes	%	±%
Liberal	John Locke	5,901	32.4	−9.4
Conservative	Marcus Beresford	5,716	31.3	+14.0
Lib-Lab	George Odger	3,496	19.2	N/A
Liberal	Andrew Dunn	3,121	17.1	−23.8
Turnout		11,975 (est)	58.6 (est)	+10.8
Registered electors		23,472		
Majority		185	1.1	−22.5
Liberal hold		Swing	−8.2	
Majority		2,595	14.2	N/A
Conservative gain from Liberal		Swing	+15.3	

=== Elections in the 1880s ===
Locke's death caused a by-election.

By-election, 14 Feb 1880: Southwark (1 seat)
Party	Candidate	Votes	%	±%
Conservative	Edward Clarke	7,683	50.2	+18.9
Liberal	Andrew Dunn	6,830	44.6	−4.9
Lib-Lab	George Shipton	799	5.2	−14.0
Majority		853	5.6	N/A
Turnout		15,312	65.2	+6.6
Registered electors		23,472		
Conservative gain from Liberal		Swing	+11.9	

General election 1880: Southwark (2 seats)
Party	Candidate	Votes	%	±%
Liberal	Arthur Cohen	9,693	27.7	−4.7
Liberal	Thorold Rogers	9,521	27.2	+10.1
Conservative	Edward Clarke	8,163	23.3	+7.6
Conservative	Mark Cattley	7,674	21.9	+6.2
Majority		1,358	3.9	+2.8
Turnout		17,526 (est)	74.7 (est)	+16.1
Registered electors		23,472		
Liberal hold		Swing	−5.5	
Liberal gain from Conservative		Swing	+1.3	

=== Elections in the 1950s ===
General election 1950: Southwark
Party	Candidate	Votes	%	±%
Labour	George Isaacs	35,049	68.27	
Conservative	James Greenwood (MP)	12,671	24.68	
Liberal	Lionel Fowler	2,950	5.75	
Communist	Spencer John Bent	668	1.30	
Majority		22,378	43.59	
Turnout		51,338	73.98	
Labour win (new seat)				

General election 1951: Southwark
Party	Candidate	Votes	%	±%
Labour	George Isaacs	36,586	72.28	
Conservative	James Greenwood (MP)	14,032	27.72	
Majority		22,554	44.56	
Turnout		50,618	72.32	
Labour hold		Swing		

General election 1955: Southwark
Party	Candidate	Votes	%	±%
Labour	George Isaacs	28,174	70.30	
Conservative	James Greenwood (MP)	10,944	27.31	
Communist	Spencer John Bent	959	2.39	New
Majority		17,230	42.99	
Turnout		40,077	60.18	
Labour hold		Swing		

General election 1959: Southwark
Party	Candidate	Votes	%	±%
Labour	Ray Gunter	25,036	63.99	
Conservative	James Greenwood (MP)	12,696	32.45	
Communist	Spencer John Bent	1,395	3.57	
Majority		12,340	31.54	
Turnout		39,127	63.37	
Labour hold		Swing		

=== Elections in the 1960s ===
General election 1964: Southwark
Party	Candidate	Votes	%	±%
Labour	Ray Gunter	22,426	68.82	
Conservative	Anthony Paul R Noble	8,563	26.28	
Communist	Spencer John Bent	1,599	4.91	
Majority		13,863	42.54	
Turnout		32,588	55.86	
Labour hold		Swing		

General election 1966: Southwark
Party	Candidate	Votes	%	±%
Labour	Ray Gunter	21,855	73.55	
Conservative	Anthony Paul Noble	6,454	21.72	
Communist	Spencer John Bent	1,404	4.73	
Majority		15,401	51.83	
Turnout		29,713	54.03	
Labour hold		Swing		

=== Elections in the 1970s ===
General election 1970: Southwark
Party	Candidate	Votes	%	±%
Labour	Ray Gunter	16,834	67.33	
Conservative	Jeffrey Gordon	7,040	28.16	
Communist	Earle Hume	1,128	4.51	
Majority		9,794	39.17	
Turnout		25,002	48.19	
Labour hold		Swing		

1972 Southwark by-election
Party	Candidate	Votes	%	±%
Labour	Harry Lamborn	12,108	79.33	+12.00
Conservative	Jeffrey Gordon	2,756	18.06	−10.10
Independent	Brian McDermott	398	2.61	New
Majority		9,352	61.27	+22.10
Turnout		15,262		
Labour hold		Swing		

== Sources ==
- Robert Beatson, A Chronological Register of Both Houses of Parliament (London: Longman, Hurst, Res & Orme, 1807) A Chronological Register of Both Houses of the British Parliament, from the Union in 1708, to the Third Parliament of the United Kingdom of Great Britain and Ireland, in 1807
- D Brunton & D H Pennington, Members of the Long Parliament (London: George Allen & Unwin, 1954)
- Cobbett's Parliamentary history of England, from the Norman Conquest in 1066 to the year 1803 (London: Thomas Hansard, 1808) Digital Bodleian
- F W S Craig, British Parliamentary Election Results 1832–1885 (2nd edition, Aldershot: Parliamentary Research Services, 1989)
- Leigh Rayment's Historical List of MPs – Constituencies beginning with "S" (part 4)
