= William Pratt (MP for Southwark) =

English politician

William Pratt (fl. 1589) was an English politician.

He was a member (MP) of the parliament of England for Southwark in 1589.
