= Zachariah Lok =

English politician

- Born: 1561; London, England
- Died: 1603 (aged 41–42); London, England
- Occupation: Politician

Zachariah Lok (1561–1603), of London, was an English politician. He was a Member of Parliament (MP) for Ipswich in 1593 and Southwark, London in 1601.

He was the son of Michael Lok and his first wife, Joan Wilkinson, daughter of William Wilkinson.
