= John Welles (Southwark MP) =

Member of the Parliament of England

John Welles (died 1439 or after), of London and Southwark, Surrey, was an English Member of Parliament, spicer and property owner.

He was a Member (MP) of the Parliament of England for Lewes in April 1414, 1419 and 1431.
