= Atalanta (disambiguation) =

Atalanta is a heroine in Greek mythology.

Atalanta may also refer to:

== Fauna ==
- Vanessa atalanta, a species of butterfly

== Geography ==
- Atalanta (island), an island in the Opuntian Gulf in Greece
- Atalanta (Bottiaea), a town of ancient Macedon
- Atalanta, Santa Catarina, a town in Brazil
- Atalanti Island (Attica), an island in the Saronic Gulf in Greece also known as Atalanta
- Lake Atalanta, a manmade lake in Rogers, Arkansas

== People ==
- Atalanta Kërçyku (born 1992), Albanian TV host and beauty pageant titleholder

== Sport ==
- Atalanta BC, an Italian association football club
  - Atalanta Mozzanica Calcio Femminile Dilettantistico, an Italian women's association football club, sponsored by Atalanta BC
- The Atalanta's Society, Oxford, the leading student society at the University of Oxford dedicated to supporting and promoting women in sport founded in 1992
- Atalanta Stakes, flat horse race in Britain
- Huddersfield Atalanta Ladies F.C., 1920s English women's football team

== Vehicles ==
=== Railway locomotives ===
- Atalanta, a GWR 3031 Class locomotive built for and run on the Great Western Railway between 1891 and 1915

=== Automobiles ===
- Atalanta (1915 automobile), a British car made from 1915 to 1917
- Atalanta (1936 automobile), a touring model of the British Armstrong Siddeley
- Atalanta (1937 automobile), a British sports car made between 1937 and 1939
- Atalanta Motors, British sports car company relaunched in 2012
- Bugatti Atalante, a sports car made from 1936 to 1938

=== Aircraft ===
- Armstrong Whitworth Atalanta (A.W. 15), a British aircraft of the 1930s manufactured by Armstrong Whitworth
- Fairey N.4 (Atalanta), prototype of the Fairey N.4 class of flying boat
- Lockheed P-38 Lightning, known as the Lockheed Atalanta in design, a World War II era fighter plane

== Vessels ==
=== Ships ===
- Atalanta, one of several mercantile vessels of that name
- HMS Atalanta, one of six ships in the British navy bearing this name

=== Yachts ===
- Atalanta (1883), a steam yacht owned by Jay Gould, later a gunboat of the Venezuelan Navy and for a short time of the German Imperial Navy
- Fairey Atalanta, a class of sailing yacht built by Fairey Marine Ltd, variants 20, 26, and 30 feet overall

== Other uses ==
- Atalanta (magazine) (1887–1898), a British literary magazine for girls
- Atalanta (opera), an opera by George Frideric Handel
- Atalanta (Pantheon), a member of the Pantheon, a fictional group from Marvel Comics
- Atalanta (sculpture), a sculpture by Francis Derwent Wood
- Atalanta Fugiens, 1617 emblem book by Michael Maier and Matthias Merian
- Atalanta Ltd, a British women's engineering company operating between 1920 and 1928
- Atalanta, a character in George Frideric Handel's opera Serse (also known as Xerxes)
- Atalanta, sister of Perdiccas, Macedonian general, successor of Alexander the Great
- Ediciones Atalanta, Spanish publishing house
- Operation Atalanta, an EU naval mission

== See also ==
- Atalante (disambiguation)
- Atalanti (disambiguation)
- Atlanta (disambiguation)
- Atlanta, the largest city in the US state of Georgia
- Atlante (disambiguation)
- Atlantic (disambiguation)
- Atlantis (disambiguation)
