= Atalanti (disambiguation) =

Atalanti may refer to:

== Places ==
- Atalanti, Phthiotis, Greece; a town
- Atalanti Island, Phthiotis, Greece; an island in the North Euboean Gulf
- Atalanti Island (Attica), Greece; an island
- Atalanti (Bottiaea), Macedonian Empire; a former ancient city

== Other uses ==
- Atalanti Maria Tasouli (born 1976), Greek basketball player

== See also ==
- The New Atalantis, a political satire
- Atalanta (disambiguation)
- Atalante (disambiguation)
- Atlant (disambiguation)
- Atlante (disambiguation)
- Atlanta (disambiguation)
- Atlantic (disambiguation)
- Atlantis (disambiguation)
