= Atalanta (ship) =

Several vessels have been named Atalanta after the athlete Atalanta in ancient Greek mythology.

- Atalanta (1798 ship) was launched in Holland, perhaps under another name. She was captured in 1798, and thereafter traded generally. Between 1801 and 1804 she made two voyages as a slave ship in the triangular trade in enslaved people, and may have been temporarily captured during the second. Between 1808 and 1814 she made two voyages as a whaler in Australian and New Zealand waters. She was last listed in 1833.
- Atalanta (1799 ship) was built in Bermuda in 1799. She sailed to London and then between 1800 and 1802 she made two complete voyages as a slave ship. New owners sailed her as a West Indiaman. She suffered a minor maritime incident in 1803. A French privateer captured her in 1804.
- Atalanta (1811 ship) was launched at Newcastle-upon-Tyne in 1811. She initially sailed as a government transport, sailing to the Indian Ocean. She also captured an American vessel after the outbreak of war with the United States. She then became a West Indiaman, and later traded with Sierra Leone and Madeira. She made one voyage to Bombay, sailing under a licence from the British East India Company (EIC). She was broken up circa 1831.
- Atalanta (1883)
- TSS Atalanta was a passenger vessel built for the London and South Western Railway in 1907.

== See also ==
- HMS Atalanta or HMS Atalante, one of eight vessels of the British Royal Navy.
- Atalante, one of eight vessels of the French Navy
- USCGC Atalanta
