= Atalante =

Atalante is the French name for Atalanta, a heroine of Greek mythology.

Atalante also may refer to:

== Places ==
- 36 Atalante, an asteroid
- L'Atalante basin, a deep hypersaline anoxic basin in the Mediterranean sea.

=== Greece ===
- Atalante (island), an island in Central Greece
- Atalante (Attica), an island in Attica, Greece
- Atalante (Macedon), a town of ancient Macedon, Greece
- Atalante (Phthiotis), a town in Phthiotis, Greece

=== Fictional locations ===
- Númenor, a fictional island in J. R. R. Tolkien's legendarium, also called "Atalantë"

== People ==
- Atalantē, sister of Macedonian general Perdiccas and wife of Attalus

=== Fictional characters ===
- Atlantes, a magician in Boiardo's Orlando Innamorato (1482)

== Arts and entertainment ==
- L'Atalante, a 1934 French film
- Akallabêth, a short story by Tolkien about the Fall of Númenor, subtitled Atalantë

== Transportation and vehicles ==
- Atalante, a body style for the 1937 Bugatti Type 57 automobile
- French ship Atalante, various ships of the French Navy

== Other uses ==
- Atalante Quebec, a far-right group in Quebec

== See also ==
- Atalanta (disambiguation)
- Atalanti (disambiguation)
- Atlante (disambiguation)
- Atlanta (disambiguation)
- Atlantic (disambiguation)
- Atlantis (disambiguation)
