= Charles Napier (Royal Navy officer) =

British naval officer and politician (1786–1860)

Admiral Sir Charles Napier KCB
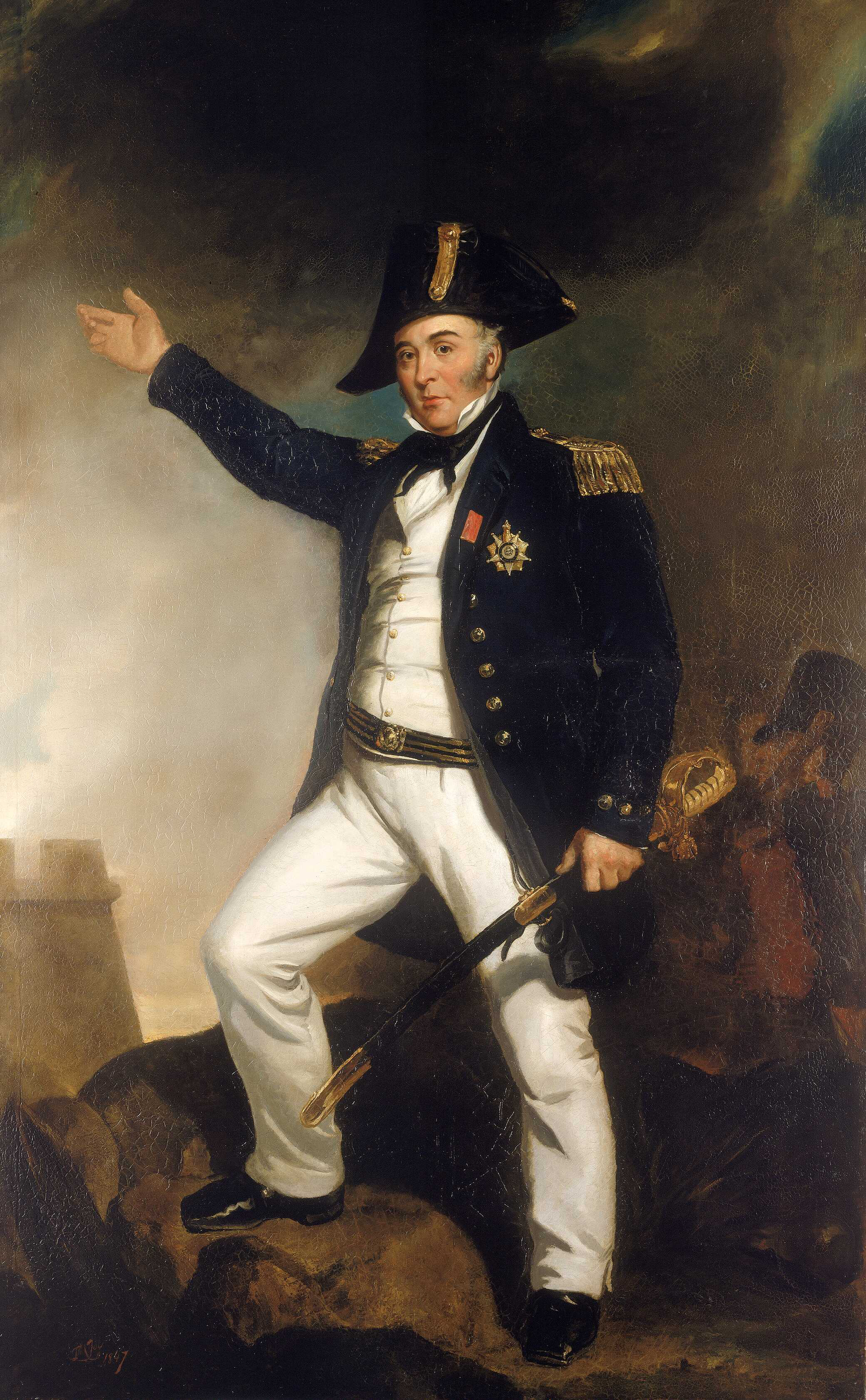
- Portrait by Thomas Musgrave Joy, c. 1847
- Born: 6 March 1786; Falkirk, Scotland
- Died: 6 November 1860 (aged 74); Hampshire, England
- Education: University of Edinburgh
- Military career
- Allegiance: Great Britain; United Kingdom; Portugal
- Branch: Royal Navy; Portuguese Navy
- Service years: 1799–1853
- Rank: Admiral (Royal Navy)
- Conflicts: Napoleonic Wars; War of 1812; Miguelite War; Egyptian-Ottoman War; Crimean War
- Awards: Order of the Bath; Order of the Tower and Sword; Military Order of Maria Theresa

Admiral Sir Charles John Napier KCB (6 March 1786 (Note: Priscilla Napier (1995), who is not elsewhere free from error, gives the birth year as 1787 (p. 1, and book title), but provides no evidence. All other authorities agree on 1786.) – 6 November 1860) was a British naval officer and politician who served for sixty years in the Royal Navy, seeing action in the French Revolutionary and Napoleonic Wars, War of 1812, Syrian War and Crimean War. For a period he also commanded the Portuguese Navy during the Liberal Wars. An innovator concerned with the development of ironclads, and an advocate of human reforms in the Royal Navy, Napier was also active in politics as a Liberal Member of Parliament and was probably the naval officer most widely known to the public in the early Victorian era.

== Military career ==
=== French Revolutionary and Napoleonic Wars ===
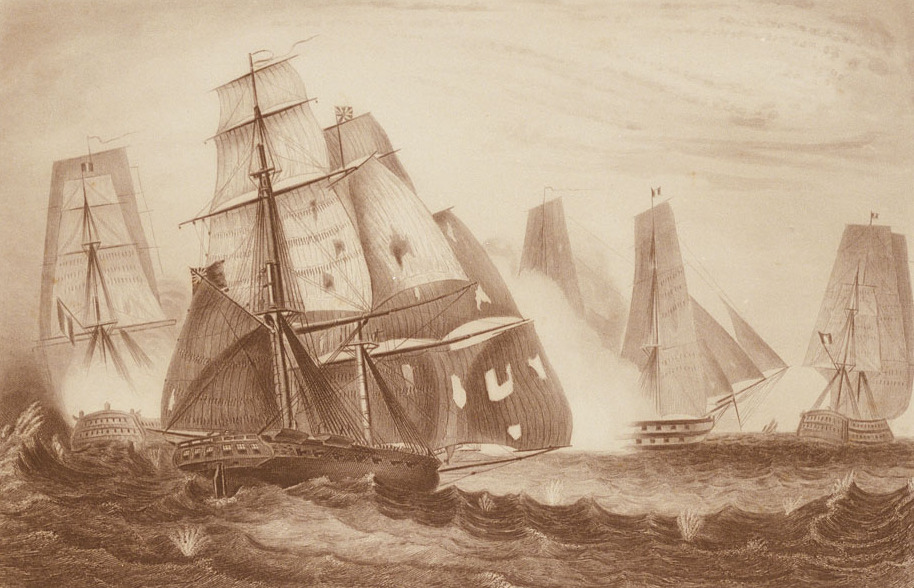
Intrepid behaviour of Captn Charles Napier, in H M 18 gun Brig Recruit for which he was appointed to the D' Haupoult. The 74 now pouring a broadside into her on 15 April 1809 with D'Hautpoul visible in the background

Napier became a midshipman in 1799 aboard the 16-gun sloop HMS Martin, but left her in May 1800 before she was lost with all hands. He next served aboard Renown, flagship of Sir John Borlase Warren. (Note: Priscilla Napier states (p. 3) he was made midshipman in 1800 and "entered on the books of" HMS Martin, but never actually served in her, because she was lost before he could join her; but Edward Elers Napier (p. 6) quotes a contemporary account showing he was made midshipman in 1799 and sailed in Martin from Leith Roads in November of that year. Martin disappeared, presumed lost with all hands, in October 1800, therefore 5 months after Napier left her for Renown.) After this, in November 1802, he transferred to the frigate Greyhound under Captain William Hoste. The following year, he moved to Égyptienne for a voyage to St Helena escorting a convoy of ships and then in the English Channel and off the coast of France. (In later years, feeling he had been badly treated as a midshipman by her captain, Charles Fleeming, Napier challenged that officer to a duel, though they were eventually reconciled by their seconds.) In 1804–5 he served briefly on Mediator before moving to HMS Renommée off Boulogne. He was promoted lieutenant on 30 November 1805. He was appointed to Courageux, and was present in her in the West Indies at the action in which the squadron under Admiral Warren took the French Marengo (80 guns) and Belle Poule (40 guns), on 13 March 1806. After returning home with Warren, he returned to the West Indies in HMS St George and having been promoted to commander on 30 November 1807, he was appointed acting commander of the brig Pultusk of 16 guns, formerly the French privateer Austerlitz. In August 1808 he became captain of the brig-sloop HMS Recruit (18 guns), and in her fought a hot action off Antigua with the French sloop Diligente (18 guns), in which his thigh was smashed by a cannonball.

In April 1809, Napier took part in the capture of the Caribbean island of Martinique, and subsequently distinguished himself in the pursuit of three escaping French ships of the line, handling the small Recruit so well that the British were able to capture the French flagship D'Hautpoul. As a result, he was promoted acting post captain and briefly given the command of the captured 74-gun ship-of-the-line.

His rank was confirmed on 22 May 1809, but he was put on half-pay, when he came home as temporary captain of the frigate Jason escorting a convoy. While on half-pay he spent some time at the University of Edinburgh.

Napier, still on half-pay, then went to Portugal to visit his three cousins, (all colonels serving in Wellington's army, and one of whom was Charles James Napier, the future conqueror of Sindh). He took part in the Battle of Buçaco, during which he saved his cousin Charles's life and was himself wounded.

In 1811, he was appointed captain of the frigate HMS Thames (32 guns) and served in the Mediterranean Fleet under Sir Edward Pellew, disrupting enemy shipping. Among his principal exploits was the 1813 capture of the island of Ponza, which was a possible haven for corsairs. (Note: From this exploit he took the pseudonym of "Charles, Conte di Ponza" (Charles, Count of Ponza) when he commanded a Portuguese naval squadron during the Liberal Wars.) In 1813 he moved to command the frigate Euryalus (36 guns), operating mainly off the French and Spanish Mediterranean coast.

=== War of 1812 and Hundred Days ===
After the surrender of Napoleon and his first period of exile in 1814, Napier and his ship were transferred to the coast of North America, where the War of 1812 with the United States was still in progress, now commanded by Vice Admiral Sir Alexander Cochrane. In the Chesapeake Bay campaign, he took part in the August expedition up the Potomac River to Alexandria (southeast of the American national capital), Arriving several days after the Burning of Washington and the Battle of Bladensburg under Maj. Gen. Robert Ross and Rear Admiral Sir George Cockburn, he was second in command to Captain James Alexander Gordon. The British squadron took 10 days to travel 50 miles (80 km) upriver, with many strandings and damage from a tornado/thunderstorm (after the Washington fires), but on 28 August 1814 before attempting a bombardment, they captured Fort Washington on the north shoreline which was blown up by the Americans prior to the attack. The town of Alexandria capitulated with a ransom paid and the shipping there was seized. The squadron successfully withdrew downriver with their prizes despite frequent harassing American attacks from the shores downstream. During the withdrawal, Napier was wounded in the neck.

He next distinguished himself in the following attack on Baltimore, Maryland, by a British Army accompanied by 16 warships, 12–14 September 1814, under Admirals Cochrane, and Cockburn. HMS Euryalus was involved in the bombardment of Fort McHenry, protecting the city on the Northwest Branch of the Patapsco River that began early in the morning of the 13th. At. the same time, earlier on the 12th, Gen. Ross had been put ashore to the southeast at North Point with his regiments to attack the town from the east. He was shot in a brief skirmish just before his troops met the City Brigade regiments of the Maryland Militia under Brig. Gen. John Stricker at the Battle of North Point that afternoon. After pausing for the night to tend to the substantial wounded and now under the command of Col. Arthur Brooke, the regiments waited outside the substantial American dug-in fortifications with opposing approx. 20,000 troops and 100 artillery at old Loudenschlager's Hill in present-day Hampstead Hill in western Patterson Park until the naval forces were able to subdue the fort and move upriver to attack the eastern land redoubts. The critical period of the attack developed shortly after midnight when a picked British force in longboats armed with scaling ladders under Napier's command penetrated the Middle or Ferry Branch of the river along the southern opposite shore, today's Brooklyn and Fairfield areas of southern Baltimore and Anne Arundel County to the west of the fort with the intention of storming it from the rear flank. Before they could land, however, they were detected and subjected to a withering fire from the still active guns of Fort McHenry and two smaller forts to the west, batteries Covington and Babcock. The British fought back strongly with cannon and rockets, but Napier's force eventually retreated to the warships with substantial casualties, and Cochrane's fleet later withdrew on the morning of the 14th.

Euryalus proceeded to Halifax, Nova Scotia for refitting and then took part in the ongoing blockade of the eastern seaboard of the U.S.A.. Bored by such duties, Napier issued a challenge to the American frigate Constellation, which had been lying in on the Elizabeth River harbor near the U.S. Naval base at Norfolk, Virginia, (since making her only war cruise during the first year of the War) to come out and fight a single-ship duel. The challenge was accepted and due arrangements were made 'in the most gentlemanly fashion', but Euryalus was made part of the squadron that Admiral Cochrane took to Florida and Louisiana in December 1814 in the operations that climaxed in the Battle of New Orleans on 8 January 1815, and before she could return to fulfil her engagement with Constellation news of the peace treaty of Ghent reached the USA.

With Napoleon's escape from Elba and brief return to power, the Hundred Days, Euryalus returned to Britain. Napier's last mission of the Napoleonic wars was to land troops at the mouth of the River Scheldt to guard against the French advance into Belgium.

== Personal life ==
At the end of the war Napier was made a Companion of the Bath (4 June 1815). He married Frances Elizabeth Elers, née Younghusband, generally referred to as Eliza, whom he had known and loved in Edinburgh while still a teenager. In the meantime Eliza had married a Lieutenant Edward Elers and been widowed. She had four children whom Napier adopted as his own. Of these the second son, Charles Elers Napier, became a naval officer. The eldest, Edward Elers Napier, entered the army, rising to the rank of major-general: he also wrote books of travel and reminiscence, as well as the authoritative biography of his stepfather. Frances also gave Napier two children of his own, a son born in Rome and a daughter born by Lake Geneva. The son, Charles, died as a result of an accident aged five. The first years of his leisure Napier spent in Italy, Switzerland (where he briefly took up farming), and in Paris. He had inherited considerable wealth from his mother's side of the family and spent it freely.

== Steam and iron ==
During these years Napier began a voluminous and indefatigable correspondence with the Admiralty on the urgency for naval reform, which lasted for the rest of his career. He sought to persuade successive civil administrations of the need for innovative ship-design and tactics, the development of steam ships and the use of iron in ship construction, the proper training of officers, and decent living conditions for ordinary seamen. He held that the use of the press gang and of flogging should be abolished, and that seamen should receive proper wages and pensions. In all this he was far ahead of his time. His advocacy had little effect: on the contrary, successive administrators considered him an eccentric nuisance. He had been interested in steam navigation since its beginnings, and began investing his considerable resources in a steam vessel service that would ply along the River Seine. In 1821 he financed and participated in the construction of one of the first iron-hulled vessels ever built, and the first designed to venture into open water. The Aaron Manby was named after the master of the Horseley Ironworks, Tipton, Staffordshire, where she was pre-fabricated to a design formulated by Napier, Manby and Manby's son Charles and then assembled at Rotherhithe on the Thames. After trials in May 1822, the Aaron Manby crossed the English Channel to Le Havre under Napier's command on 10 June 1822, and proceeded up the Seine to Paris, where she caused a great stir and where she was based for the next decade. This has been claimed as the first passage from France to Britain by steam ship, which it was not: but it was the first direct passage from London to Paris by steam ship and the first seagoing voyage by an iron ship anywhere. Napier's company built five similar steamships but in 1827 he went bankrupt, leaving the family in severe financial difficulty. (Sold off, the ships gave 30 years further service.)

== Portugal ==
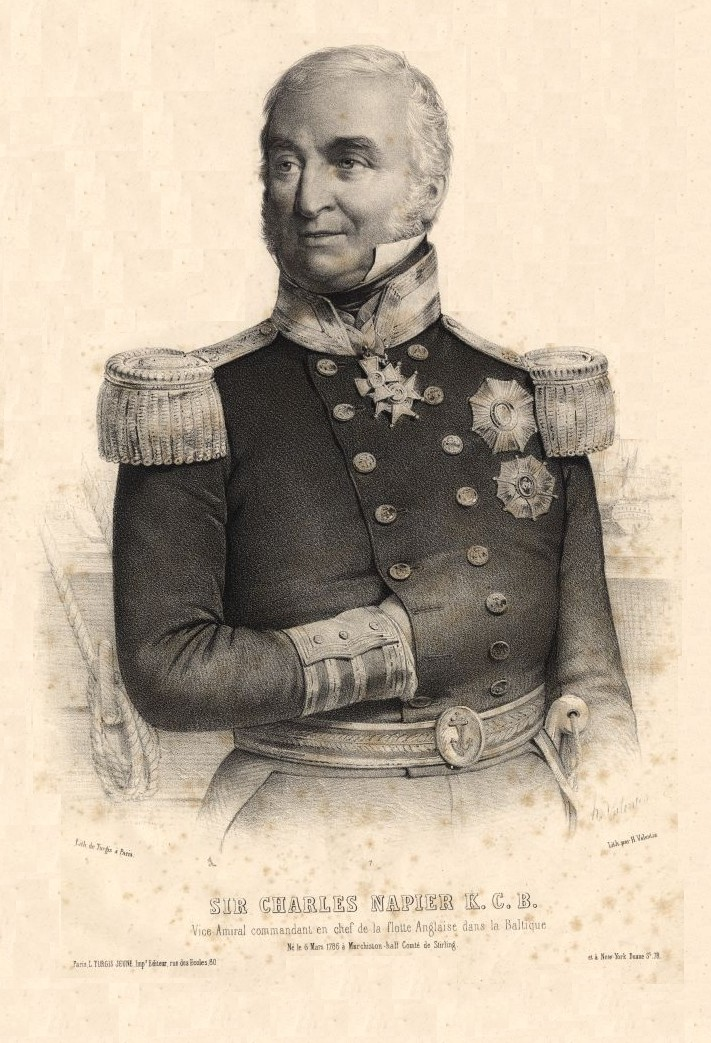
Napier in 1854

At the beginning of 1829, he was appointed to command the 42-gun frigate Galatea. The Admiralty gave him permission to fit her with paddles of his own design, worked by winches on the main deck. He carried out trials that proved that ships could travel independently of the wind. The Admiralty, however, did not adopt this innovation.

At the start of Portugal's Liberal Wars in 1832 Napier was at the Azores, which were the only part of Portuguese territory still held for Queen Maria II of Portugal against the usurpation of her uncle, the absolutist Dom Miguel. He so impressed the constitutional leaders, especially the Count de Vila Flor (better known by his later title of Duke of Terceira), that they begged him to take command of their small fleet. Having unsuccessfully contested the parliamentary by-election for Portsmouth in June 1832 after Galatea was paid off, he accepted their proposals in February 1833.

Sailing to Portugal with his stepson Charles Elers Napier as aide-de-camp, bringing troop reinforcements and using the incognito of 'Carlos da Ponza', he arrived in Porto, where Queen Maria's father Dom Pedro, ex-Emperor of Brazil, and the Liberal forces were being besieged by Miguel's armies. He assumed command of the Liberal fleet, succeeding its previous British commander George Rose Sartorius.

With the fleet Napier then transported the Liberal army to the Algarve to open a second front in the south of the country. On his return voyage he destroyed the much larger Miguelite fleet in the Battle of Cape St Vincent on 5 July 1833. These two strokes enabled the Liberals to capture Lisbon, which the Miguelites abandoned, though Napier's squadron was now ravaged by cholera.

On the demand of France Napier was struck off the British navy list. On the other hand, Dom Pedro appointed him Admiral of the Portuguese Navy on 10 July. Napier's victory, with a fleet largely manned by British seamen, was viewed in Britain as a credit to the Royal Navy. The victory and consequent accolades greatly annoyed King William IV, who disliked both Napier and Dom Pedro.

Continuing his Portuguese services, Napier commanded land forces in the successful defence of Lisbon, September 1833. For these services he was made Commander of the Tower and Sword, and Count of the Cape of Saint Vincent in the Peerage of Portugal.

On 12 September 1833, he captured The Lord of the Isles steamer at Sao Martinho and in 1836 defended his prize in the Court of Common Pleas.

In 1834, with a small army made up largely of British sailors, he reconquered the Minho region for the constitutional cause. After the final defeat of Miguel and the death of Dom Pedro shortly afterwards, Napier found himself frustrated in his attempts to reform the naval administration of Portugal and returned to England. His departure was followed by a vote of thanks to him in both houses of the restored Portuguese parliament.

Napier unsuccessfully contested the Portsmouth parliamentary seat for a second time in the by-election of December 1834. He then occupied himself until 1836 with writing a history of the Portuguese War and his own part in it.

== Syrian War ==
Though he published his An Account of the War in Portugal as 'Admiral Charles Napier', he was only an Admiral as far as Portugal was concerned. He was restored to his former rank of captain in the British Navy List by an Order in Council on 9 March 1836, and in July 1837 unsuccessfully contested the by-election for Greenwich in the Liberal cause. In 1838 received command of the ship of the line HMS Powerful (84 guns).

When troubles broke out in Syria and Muhammad Ali, ruler of Egypt, invaded it and destroyed a Turkish army, Napier was ordered to the Mediterranean. On the evening of 29 May 1839 Powerful was anchored in the Cove of Cork, Ireland when urgent orders came from the Admiralty to proceed at once to Malta. He was also informed that the ships-of-the-line Ganges and Implacable had already started from England. Wishing to overtake them, Napier set sail at 2 a.m. on the 30th for Gibraltar. Powerful arrived at Gibraltar on 12 June to hear the other two ships were three days ahead of her, but by superior seamanship Napier overtook them in the Mediterranean and Powerful entered the harbour of La Valletta, Malta on the evening of 24 June, with band playing and under every stitch of canvas, twelve hours ahead of her rivals. There followed a lull of about a year.

In the summer of 1840 the Maronite Christians of Lebanon rose in revolt against the occupying Egyptians and Muhammad Ali in retaliation sent Ibrahim Pasha with 15,000 troops to burn towns and villages along the Lebanese coast. By 1 July 1840 Napier, with a detached squadron and the rank of commodore, was patrolling the coast to protect British interests. Though in August he appeared off Beirut and called upon Suleiman Pasha, Muhammad Ali's governor, to abandon the town and leave Syria, there was little he could do until September, when he was joined by the allied fleet under Admiral Robert Stopford: mainly British, but also including Austrian, Ottoman and Russian warships. Open war broke out on 11 September. Due to the illness of the army commander, Brigadier-General Sir Charles Smith, Napier was instructed to lead the land force, and effected a landing at D'jounie with 1,500 Turks and marines to operate against Ibrahim, who was prevented by the revolt from doing more than trying to hold the coastal cities. Meanwhile, Stopford, claiming his flag of truce had been fired on, bombarded Beirut, killing many civilians. Napier next distinguished himself by leading an attack by land and sea on Sidon, the Egyptian army's southern base, which capitulated on 28 September.

The Egyptians abandoned Beirut on 3 October. While preparing to attack them at Boharsef, Napier was ordered to relinquish command of the army to withdraw and hand over the land forces to the now recovered Brigadier-General Smith. To do so would have meant giving up the tactical initiative, and Napier accordingly disobeyed the order and continued with the attack against Ibrahim's army. The ensuing Battle of Boharsef, on 10 October, was a hard-fought victory, one of the very few land battles won by a naval officer. By the end of the month the only coastal position still held by the Egyptians was Acre, which Stopford was instructed to recapture.

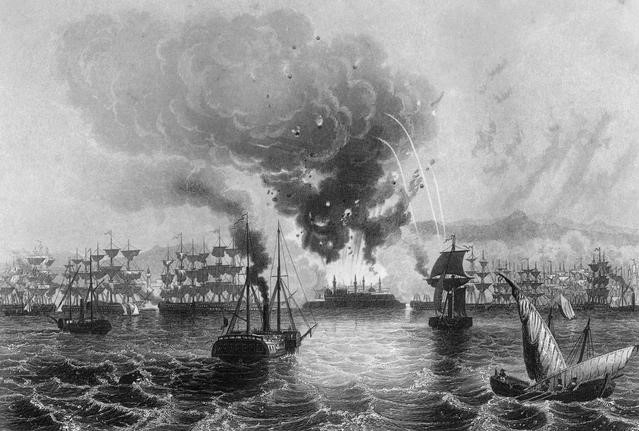
Bombardment of St Jean D'Acre, by Admiral Napier, 3 November 1840

On 3 November the Mediterranean Fleet, with its Turkish and Austrian allies, moved into position against the western and southern sides of the town. The fire of the ships (48,000 rounds in all) was devastatingly accurate. A shell penetrated the main magazine in the south of the city, which exploded killing 1,100 men. That night Acre was occupied. British losses were only 18 men killed and 41 wounded. During the action, Napier had manoeuvred independently against Stopford's orders and his division, by accident and mutual misunderstandings, left a space in the fleet's deployment, not that this affected the outcome. Some captains wanted Napier to be court-martialled for insubordination, but Stopford did not push the issue.

The rapid collapse of Muhammad Ali's power, with the prospect of bloody chaos in Egypt, was not part of the Allies' plan, so Stopford sent Napier to command the squadron at Alexandria and to observe the situation. Here, acting once again on his own initiative, Napier appeared before the city on 25 November and enforced a blockade.

Napier, without reference to his admiral or the British government, personally negotiated a peace with Muhammad Ali. The treaty guaranteed Muhammad Ali and his heirs the sovereignty of Egypt, and pledged to evacuate Ibrahim's beleaguered army back to Alexandria, if Muhammad Ali in turn renounced all claims to Syria, submitted to the Sultan and returned the Ottoman fleet. 'I do not know if I have done right in settling the eastern question', Napier wrote on 26 November to Lord Minto, the First Lord of the Admiralty. Stopford repudiated the arrangement immediately when he had heard the news; the Sultan and the British ambassador were furious, and several of the Allied powers declared it void. Nevertheless, the formal treaty later concluded and confirmed on 27 November was essentially a ratification of Napier's original, and his friend Lord Palmerston congratulated Napier. (Muhammad Ali's last heir, King Farouk, ruled Egypt until 23 July 1952, when the Free Officers Movement under Muhammad Naguib and Gamal Abdel Nasser staged a military coup that launched the Egyptian Revolution of 1952 and forced him to abdicate.)

== Parliament and Channel Fleet ==
In acknowledgement of his distinguished services during the campaign, Napier was knighted as a KCB on 4 December 1840, and was also included in the vote of thanks by the Houses of Parliament. He was also presented by the Emperors of Russia and Austria and the King of Prussia with the Order of St. George of Russia; the Order of Maria Theresa of Austria; and the Red Eagle of Prussia. In January 1841, Napier carried out a special mission to Alexandria and Cairo to see that the treaty was being adhered to before returning to Britain in March.

He was invited to stand as Parliamentary candidate in two constituencies and so at his own request was placed on half pay. He was returned as Liberal Party MP for Marylebone at the 1841 general election. He spoke mainly on naval topics, especially conditions for seamen and increasing the strength of the navy. In April 1842, with 67 other MPs, he voted for the motion of William Sharman Crawford to form a committee to consider the demands of the People's Charter (1838): votes for working men, protected by secret ballot.

In November 1841, Napier was appointed Naval Aide-de-Camp to Queen Victoria. He subsequently wrote and published War in Syria, his personal account of the campaign. On 4 December 1845 he was invested with the Freedom of the City of Edinburgh.

Napier continued to be interested in warship design and was responsible for the design of the paddle-frigate Sidon launched in May 1846. In the same year he was promoted rear-admiral of the Blue on 9 November. in May 1847 he was appointed to the command of the Channel Fleet, hoisting his flag in HMS St Vincent. By this time he was perhaps the naval personality most famous to the general public: his level of everyday name-recognition is shown by the passing allusion in William Makepeace Thackeray's famous humorous ballad Little Billee ("the British fleet a-riding at anchor / with Admiral Napier, K.C.B."). He did not stand again for his parliamentary seat at Marylebone in the July–August 1847 general election.

The Channel Fleet was sometimes a sinecure, but this was by no means the case during Napier's period of command. The fleet's area of operations was not just the English Channel but more or less throughout what in the 20th century would be called the Western Approaches. Portugal was in the closing stages of its 'little' civil war, the Patuleia, and British interests in that country needed protecting. Ireland, in the aftermath of the Great Famine, was feared to be near insurrection. Moreover, there were considerations of experiment and training with new ships, made necessary by the rapid technological advances such as screw propulsion. During 1848, the fleet was mainly off the coast of Ireland, where the political situation dictated that Napier show the flag and train for the eventuality of transporting and landing soldiers on practically any part of the Irish coast. In December he took the Channel Fleet further than it had ever operated before, when it was sent to Gibraltar and then onto the Moroccan coast, with the purpose of curbing the activities of Rif pirates. He compelled the Sultan of Morocco, Muley Abderrahman, to grant compensation for the injuries he had inflicted on British commerce.

Napier returned to Britain in April 1849 and was ordered to strike his flag. His disappointment that his expected three years term had been cut short led to bitter letters to The Times criticising the Admiralty's policy. When he applied for the vacant Mediterranean command, the Government and Admiralty agreed that he could not be trusted and he was rejected, Rear-Admiral Sir James Dundas being appointed instead. This led Napier to write more angry letters to the newspapers and directly to Prime Minister Lord John Russell claiming that he had been defrauded of his just rights. He unsuccessfully contested the parliamentary seat for the Borough of Lambeth at a by-election on 7 August 1850. On 28 May 1853 he was promoted to vice-admiral of the Blue.

== Baltic Campaign of the Crimean War ==
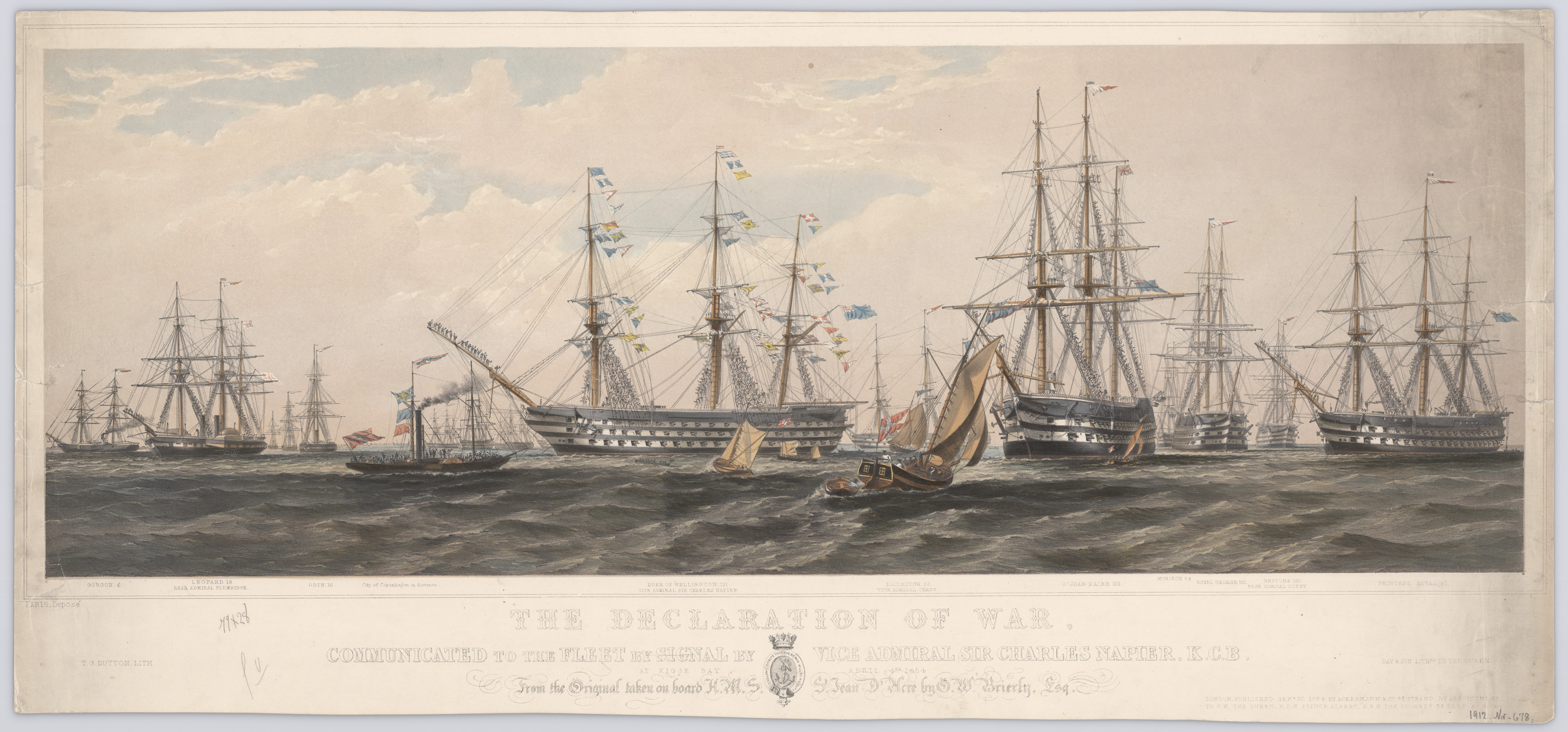
The Declaration of War communicated to the Fleet by Signal by Vice Admiral Sir Charles Napier, K.C.B., at Kioge Bay, 4 April 1854. Print by Oswald Walters Brierly-

At the outbreak of the Crimean War, Napier received the command of the Baltic Fleet, the largest fleet which the Royal Navy had assembled since the Napoleonic Wars. This was not without misgivings on the part of the Admiralty, but he was the most senior and experienced officer available. Napier hoisted his flag in February 1854 in the steam ship of the line Duke of Wellington, his subordinate commanders being the rear-admirals Armar Lowry Corry, second in command, Henry Ducie Chads, third in command, and James Hanway Plumridge, commanding the scouting forces. They were all elderly men, at most a year or so younger than Napier himself.

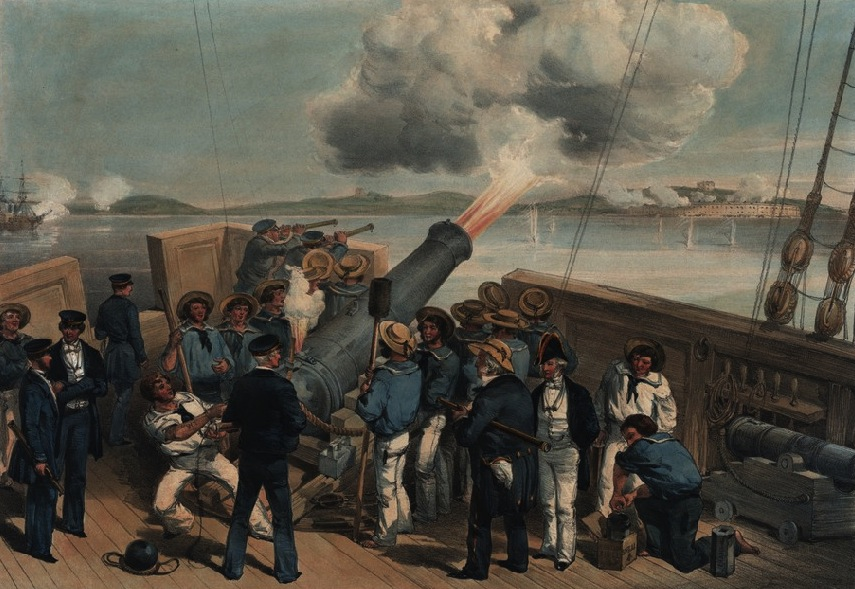
Bombardment of Bomarsund during the Åland War, which was part of the Crimean War with Napier visible in the slouch hat and carrying telescope in centre foreground

Napier's force, which was augmented in June by a French fleet sent by Napoleon III and commanded by Alexandre Ferdinand Parseval-Deschenes, though impressive on paper, was radically unsuited to operations in the Baltic Sea and chronically short of men and especially of experienced seamen. He was also hampered by contradictory sets of orders from the Admiralty. Nevertheless, he successfully blockaded all the Russian ports, sufficiently overawed the Russian Baltic Fleet that it never stirred from its moorings, and carried out many bombardment operations as far as the northernmost point of the Gulf of Finland. During the campaign the first ever Victoria Cross was won by midshipman Charles Davis Lucas of the gunboat Hecla, who threw a Russian explosive shell overboard before it could detonate. During the campaign Rear-Admiral Corry was invalided home because of poor health; he was replaced by Commodore (later Rear-Admiral) Henry Byam Martin.

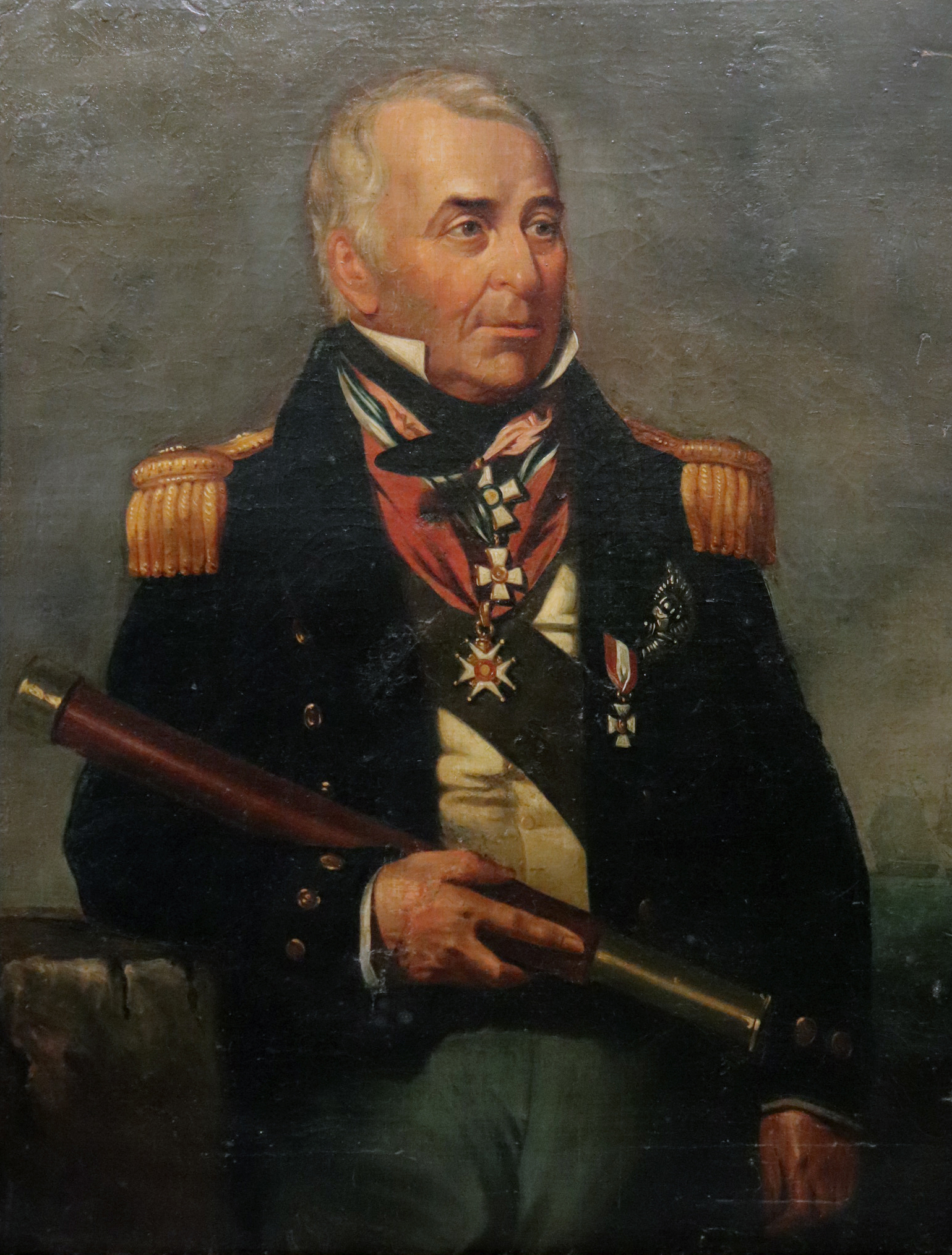
A portrait of Napier by Charles Baugniet

The major success of the campaign was the capture and destruction, in a near-perfect combined operation by French and British soldiers and sailors, of the Russian fortress of Bomarsund on Åland, which were temporarily liberated from Russian rule and which Napier offered to Sweden (they were declined). When Napier refused to attack the great naval bases at Sveaborg (often quoted as the "Gibraltar of the north") and Kronstadt, which observation had established were probably impregnable without shallow-draught bomb vessels which he did not have, a great outcry—led by The Times—was raised against him for his apparent lack of determination. His inaction was thoroughly justified by the sequel: in 1855 a better-equipped Anglo-French fleet did bombard Sveaborg, but despite an enormous expenditure of ammunition caused the fortress only trifling structural damage. Napier felt he was continually being second-guessed by the Admiralty, and especially by the First Lord of the Admiralty, Sir James Graham. In fact the Naval Lords were reacting to adverse press coverage and unwilling to accept the assessment of the commander on the spot, and relations between them deteriorated as his ships maintained the blockade in atrocious weather, quite unable to storm or destroy impregnable Russian fortresses into the bargain.

Never one to mince his words or submit to what he felt to be unmerited criticism, Napier's 'disrespectful' tone in his despatches, which the Admiralty complained of, sealed his professional fate. Nevertheless, though lacking any dramatic action apart from the capture of Bomarsund, Napier had achieved a great deal. In one modern assessment, the campaign "had successfully bottled up the Russian Navy for the entire first summer of the war. The tsar had been denied an opportunity to reinforce his Black Sea fleet with additional ships. The 30,000 Russian troops posted in the Gulf had also been prevented from joining the army in the Crimea." Napier's constant training welded the fleet personnel into a much more competent force for the next year's campaign, and not a single ship was lost.

== Retirement ==
On Napier's return from the Baltic to Britain in December 1854 he was ordered to haul down his flag and informed his command was terminated, the fleet being given for the campaign of 1855 to Admiral the Hon. Richard Saunders Dundas, the Second Sea Lord. None of the flag officers of the 1854 campaign was allowed to return to the Baltic in 1855, but Sir Michael Seymour, Napier's Captain of the Fleet, was promoted to rear-admiral and was made second-in-command to Dundas.

The Admiralty attempted to make Napier a scapegoat for the perceived failure of the campaign (which, within the limits of the possible, had been rather successful) and suborned several captains to testify to their lack of confidence in him, his timidity, his age, his lack of understanding of steam tactics, and his heavy drinking. Nevertheless, some of the leading seamen in the fleet, such as Captain (later Admiral) Sir Bartholomew Sulivan, maintained along with him that Napier's strategy had been wise and the faults lay with the Admiralty themselves.

After the war the Russians testified that, knowing Napier's reputation, their main hope had been of his making a foolhardy attack on their fleet under the guns of Kronstadt, where they were confident he would have come to grief. Napier was elected MP for Southwark in February 1855, and carried his dispute with the Admiralty to the floor of the House of Commons. He never received another command. He continued to campaign vigorously for improvements in the way common seamen were treated during and after service, and maintained his parliamentary seat, though broken in health, until his death on 6 November 1860. His tomb is in the churchyard of All Saints, Catherington in Hampshire. The ships of the Portuguese Navy went into eight days of mourning for their former commander.

Just before his death Napier had hoped to persuade Giuseppe Garibaldi to acquire a fleet for the liberation of Italy, which he would have commanded.

== Character ==
According to the Encyclopædia Britannica entry of 1911, "Sir Charles Napier was a man of undoubted energy and courage, but of no less eccentricity and vanity. He caused great offence to many of his brother officers by his behaviour to his superior, Admiral Stopford, in the Syrian War, and was embroiled all his life in quarrels with the Admiralty." Napier was a large, untidy man of about 14 stone (about 200lbs/90kg) who walked with a limp and a stoop due to his leg and neck wounds. His common nickname in the Navy was 'Black Charlie' because of his swarthy appearance and dark side-whiskers. He was also known as 'Mad Charlie' because of his eccentric behaviour and enthusiasms, and 'Dirty Charlie' from his habit of wearing the most unsuitable and ill-fitting clothes while insisting that his officers were correctly dressed at all times.

== Memorial ==
There is a memorial to him within St Paul's Cathedral.

== Works ==
- Charles John Napier (1836). An account of the war in Portugal between Don Pedro and Don Miguel. T. & W. Boone.
- Charles John Napier (1842). The war in Syria. Vol. 1. John W. Parker.
- Charles John Napier (1851). Sir William Francis Patrick Napier (ed.). The Navy, its past and present state: in a series of letters. John & Daniel A. Darling.
- Charles John Napier (1857). The history of the Baltic campaign of 1854. Richard Bently.

== Notes ==
Parliament of the United Kingdom
Preceded by The Lord Teignmouth; Sir Benjamin Hall, Bt.	Member of Parliament for Marylebone; 1841 – 1847; With: Sir Benjamin Hall, Bt.	Succeeded by Lord Dudley Stuart; Sir Benjamin Hall, Bt.
Preceded by Apsley Pellatt; Sir William Molesworth	Member of Parliament for Southwark; 1855 – 1860; With: Apsley Pellatt to 1857; John Locke from 1857	Succeeded by John Locke; Austen Henry Layard
