= Charles Elers Napier =

British naval officer

Charles George Elers Napier (22 May 1812 – 20 December 1847) was a British naval officer.

== Early life ==
Born Charles Elers, he was the second son of Lieutenant Edward Elers, RN and his wife Frances Elizabeth, née Younghusband. His uncle was George Elers. In 1815 his mother, now widowed, married Captain Charles Napier, the future admiral, who adopted her children as his own and gave them his name in addition to Elers. Charles Elers Napier entered the Royal Navy at the age of 12, his first ship being HMS Ganges.

== Career ==
In 1830 he was assigned, with the rank of mate, to the frigate HMS Galatea, then commanded by his stepfather, remaining in her until she paid off in January 1832. Later that year he passed the examination for Lieutenant and was assigned to the gunnery school in HMS Excellent. When during Portugal's Liberal Wars his stepfather was appointed Admiral of the navy of Dom Pedro, he accompanied him as aide-de-camp, with the temporary rank of captain, and distinguished himself by his bravery in the fourth Battle of Cape St. Vincent (1833) in which the navy of Dom Miguel was defeated. When his stepfather's flagship came alongside the Miguelite ship-of-the-line Rainha, Elers Napier and one other officer were the first to board her and were then cut off as the ships yawed apart. Before reinforcements could come to their aid they were both severely wounded: Elers Napier had five serious and ten minor injuries, and owing to his head injuries from sabre cuts he was rendered partially deaf for the rest of his life. For his gallantry he was made a Knight of the Order of the Tower and Sword by Dom Pedro. After he recovered he was appointed by his father to command of the sloop Portuense, and then to the corvette Sibylle, in which he sailed to Madeira to demand the surrender of the Miguelite governor. Subsequently, the ship, renamed Eliza in honour of his mother, was engaged in blockade duties off the Portuguese coast.

After his return to England, Elers Napier served from 1836 to 1837 as a lieutenant in HMS Vernon in the Mediterranean. When the First Anglo-Chinese War broke out he was appointed to the command the brig-sloop HMS Pelican on the China Station. Being superseded in this command he was on shore in China for a period and then became aide-de-camp to Admiral Sir William Parker, taking part with him in the capture of Zhenjiang by scaling the walls on 21 July 1842. In late 1847, having been made post captain, he was appointed to the command of the steam frigate HMS Avenger, joining her at Lisbon, but had been in her only a few weeks when, having left Gibraltar on course for Malta, she was wrecked at night in foul weather on the Sorelle Rocks off the island of Galita, with the loss of all but eight of her complement. Elers Napier had just given the order to lower the boats when he was washed overboard; his body was never found.
