= Atlant =

Atlant may refer to:

- Atlant (book), the first Slovene-language atlas
- Atlant-Soyuz Airlines, a Russian airline
- Atlant Moscow Oblast, a Russian professional ice hockey team
- The Myasishchev VM-T Atlant, a Russian heavy transport aircraft
- Atlant Stadium, a sports stadium in Belarus
- Atlant-class cruiser of the Soviet Navy
- Atlant (appliance company), a Belarus based appliance company

== See also ==
- The dictionary definition of Атлант at Wiktionary (Russian: Атлант, romanized: Atlant, lit. 'Atlas')
- Atlanta (disambiguation)
- Atlante (disambiguation)
- Atlas (disambiguation)
