= Atlanta (disambiguation) =

Atlanta is a major city in the United States and the capital of the state of Georgia.

Atlanta may also refer to:

== Places ==
=== In the United States ===
- Atlanta, Arkansas, an unincorporated community
- Atlanta, California, an unincorporated community
- Atlanta, Delaware, an unincorporated community
- Atlanta, Idaho, an unincorporated community
- Atlanta, Illinois, a city
- Atlanta, Indiana, a town
- Atlanta, Kansas, a city
- Atlanta, Kentucky, an unincorporated community
- Atlanta, Louisiana, a village
- Atlanta, Michigan, an unincorporated community
- Atlanta, Mississippi, an unincorporated community
- Atlanta, Missouri, a city
- Atlanta, Nebraska, a village
  - Camp Atlanta, an American World War II prisoner-of-war camp near the village
- Atlanta, New York, a hamlet
- Atlanta, Ohio, an unincorporated community
- Atlanta, Texas, a city
- Atlanta, Wisconsin, town
- Atlanta Township, Logan County, Illinois
- Atlanta Township, Rice County, Kansas
- Atlanta Township, Minnesota

=== Elsewhere ===
- Atlanta, Nova Scotia, Canada, a community
- Atlanta, South Caribbean Coast Autonomous Region, Nicaragua

== Sports ==
=== Teams ===
- Based in Atlanta, Georgia:
  - Atlanta Black Crackers, a Negro league baseball team in the early to mid-20th century
  - Atlanta Braves, a Major League Baseball team
  - Atlanta Chiefs, a soccer team in the National Professional Soccer League (1967) and the North American Soccer League (1968–1973 and 1979–1981)
  - Atlanta Crackers, a minor league baseball team (1901–1965)
  - Atlanta Dream, a Women's National Basketball Association team
  - Atlanta Falcons, a National Football League team
  - Atlanta Flames, a former National Hockey League team (1972–1980)
  - Atlanta Glory, a women's basketball team in the American Basketball League (1996–1998), also a 2012 expansion team of the Women's American Basketball Association
  - Atlanta Thrashers, a former National Hockey League team (1999–2011)
  - Atlanta Hawks, a National Basketball Association team
  - Atlanta United, a Major League Soccer team
- Club Atlético Atlanta, a sports club in Buenos Aires, Argentina

=== Other sports ===
- Atlanta Open (tennis)
- Atlanta Classic, a former PGA golf tournament
- Atlanta Motor Speedway, Atlanta, Georgia

== Military ==
- Battle of Atlanta, an 1864 American Civil War battle
- USS Atlanta, various United States Navy ships, including one that also served in the Confederate States Navy as CSS Atlanta
- Atlanta-class cruiser, a United States Navy World War II class of light cruisers

== Arts and entertainment ==
=== Music ===
- Atlanta (band), a country music band from Nashville, active since the 1980s (or their self-titled debut album)
- Atlanta (singer), Lithuanian pop singer Elena Puidokaitė (born 1981)
- Atlanta (Porcupine Tree album), 2010
- Atlanta (Evan Parker album), 1990
- Atlanta (Gnarls Barkley album), 2026
- "Atlanta," a song by Stone Temple Pilots from their 1999 album №4

=== Other arts and entertainment ===
- Atlanta (TV series) (2016–2022), an American comedy-drama television series
- Atlanta Shore, a character in Stingray TV series
- Atlanta Beanie Baby, a Beanie Baby bear produced by Ty, Inc. in 2004

== Schools ==
- Atlanta Metropolitan State College, a public college in Atlanta, Georgia
- Clark Atlanta University, originally named Atlanta University, a private, Methodist, historically black research university in Atlanta, Georgia
- University of Atlanta, a defunct private, for-profit, distance education school which was headquartered in Atlanta, Georgia

== Other uses ==
- Episcopal Diocese of Atlanta, Georgia
- Roman Catholic Archdiocese of Atlanta, Georgia
- United States Penitentiary, Atlanta, Georgia, a medium-security federal prison
- Atlanta (gastropod), a genus of sea snails
- Atlanta (magazine), a general-interest magazine based in Atlanta, Georgia
- Air Atlanta, an airline based in Atlanta, Georgia, United States, during the mid-1980s
- Call sign for Air Atlanta Icelandic
- Atlanta Centre, an office skyscraper in San Juan, Metro Manila, Philippines
- Radio Atlanta, a commercial station that operated briefly in 1964 from a ship anchored in the North Sea near England
- SS Atlanta, a Great Lakes steamer that sank in 1906

== See also ==
- Atalanta (disambiguation)
- Atlant (disambiguation)
- Atlante (disambiguation)
- Atalante (disambiguation)
- "Hot 'Lanta", an Allman Brothers song
