= Elers =

Elers is a surname, and may refer to:

- George Elers (1777–1842), British army officer
- George Elers (cricketer) (1867–1927), English cricketer
- John Philip Elers (fl. 1690–1730), English potter

== See also ==
- Elers' Kollegium, student residence located in the medieval part of Copenhagen
