= French ship Marengo =

Six ships of the French Navy have borne the name Marengo in honour of the Battle of Marengo:

- Marengo (ex-Sceptre), a 74-gun ship of the line
- Marengo (1802) (ex-Jean-Jacques Rousseau), a Téméraire-class 74-gun ship of the line
- Marengo, a 120-gun ship of the line started in 1807 as Marengo, and launched in 1851 as Ville de Paris
- Marengo (1810), a 74-gun ship of the line
- Marengo (1815), a small craft
- French ironclad Marengo (1872), an Océan-class armoured frigate

== Sources and references ==
- Roche, Jean-Michel (2005). Dictionnaire des bâtiments de la flotte de guerre française de Colbert à nos jours 1 1671 - 1870. pp. 295–296. ISBN 978-2-9525917-0-6. OCLC 165892922.
