= Atlant (appliance company) =

Belarusian household appliances company

Coordinates: 53.922310°N 27.522254°E

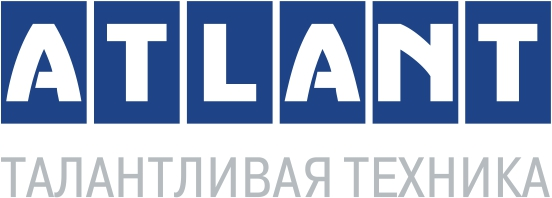

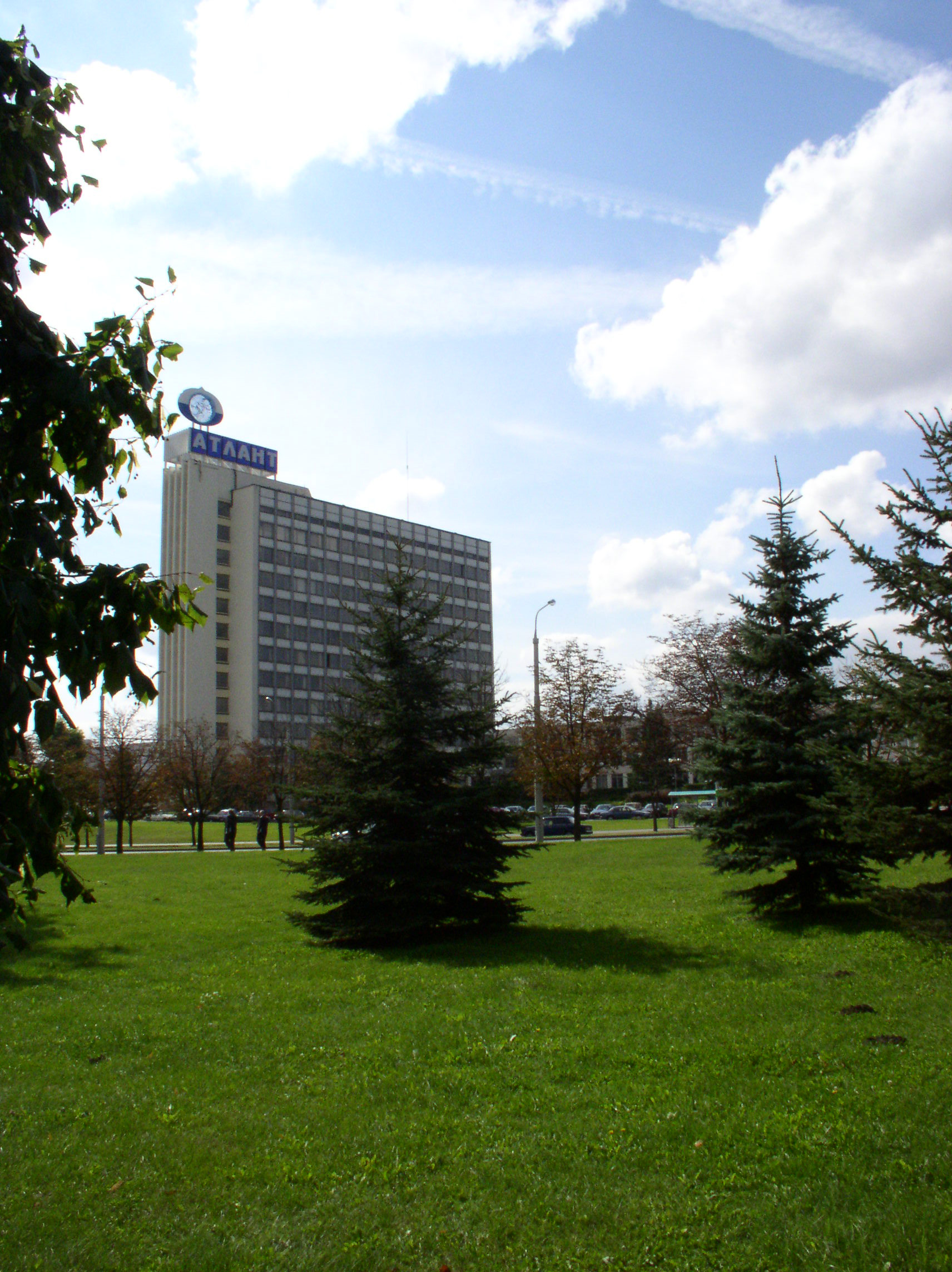
- Minsk Refrigerator Plant
- Native name: Атлант
- Type: JSC (Russian: ЗАО) – closed joint-stock company
- Industry: Household appliances
- Founded: August 24, 1959 in Minsk, Byelorussian SSR
- Founder: Council of Ministers of the Byelorussian SSR
- Headquarters: Minsk, Belarus
- Key people: Viktor Stepanovich Shumilo (CEO)
- Products: refrigerators, freezers, washing machines, and other products
- Brands: Atlant, Minsk
- Revenue: Br 489 million (2019)
- Operating income: Br 4 million (2019)
- Net income: Br 32 million (2019)
- Total assets: Br 435 million (2019)
- Website: atlant.by

Atlant (Belarusian and Russian: Атлант) is a company, based in Minsk, Belarus, which makes household appliances, and also the brand of those appliances. It is one of the leading manufacturers of household appliances in the Commonwealth of Independent States.

The company consists of three plants, the oldest and most important being the Minsk Refrigerator Plant (Belarusian: Мінскі завод халадзільнікаў), which produces household and commercial refrigerators and freezers, and by which name the entire enterprise is sometimes called. An abbreviated name for this plant is MZKh (Belarusian: МЗХ), and Minsk is the former brand used for the company's refrigerators.

In addition, Atlant owns and operates the Baranovichi Machine-Tool Plant (which produces compressors, technological systems for plastics processing, and conveyor systems) and the Household Appliances Plant (which produces washing machines and other electrical appliances).

== History ==
=== Background ===
Production of domestic refrigerators lagged in the Soviet Union compared to some other countries. The first Soviet domestic refrigerators were produced at the Kharkov Tractor Factory in 1937, but World War II soon caused production to be halted. This, and the subsequent devastation of Soviet industry, delayed the mass production of refrigerators until the 1960s, while iceboxes continued in common use.

Authorization for the building of a plant in Minsk to produce electric refrigerators was established by the Council of Ministers of the Byelorussian Soviet Socialist Republic by resolution 554 on August 24, 1959. The location selected for the plant was near Victory Park in the northwest sector of Minsk, which at that time was in the Soviet Union.

=== Under the Soviet Union ===
The first refrigerator (a CRS-125 Minsk-1 (Russian: ХКС-125 Минск-1)) was delivered in June 1962. These were the first modern Soviet refrigerators with incorporated freezers and polyurethane insulation. Mass production of Minsk-2 refrigerators began in 1964. By 1971, production facilities had been expanded, and the factory's one millionth refrigerator was produced in that year.

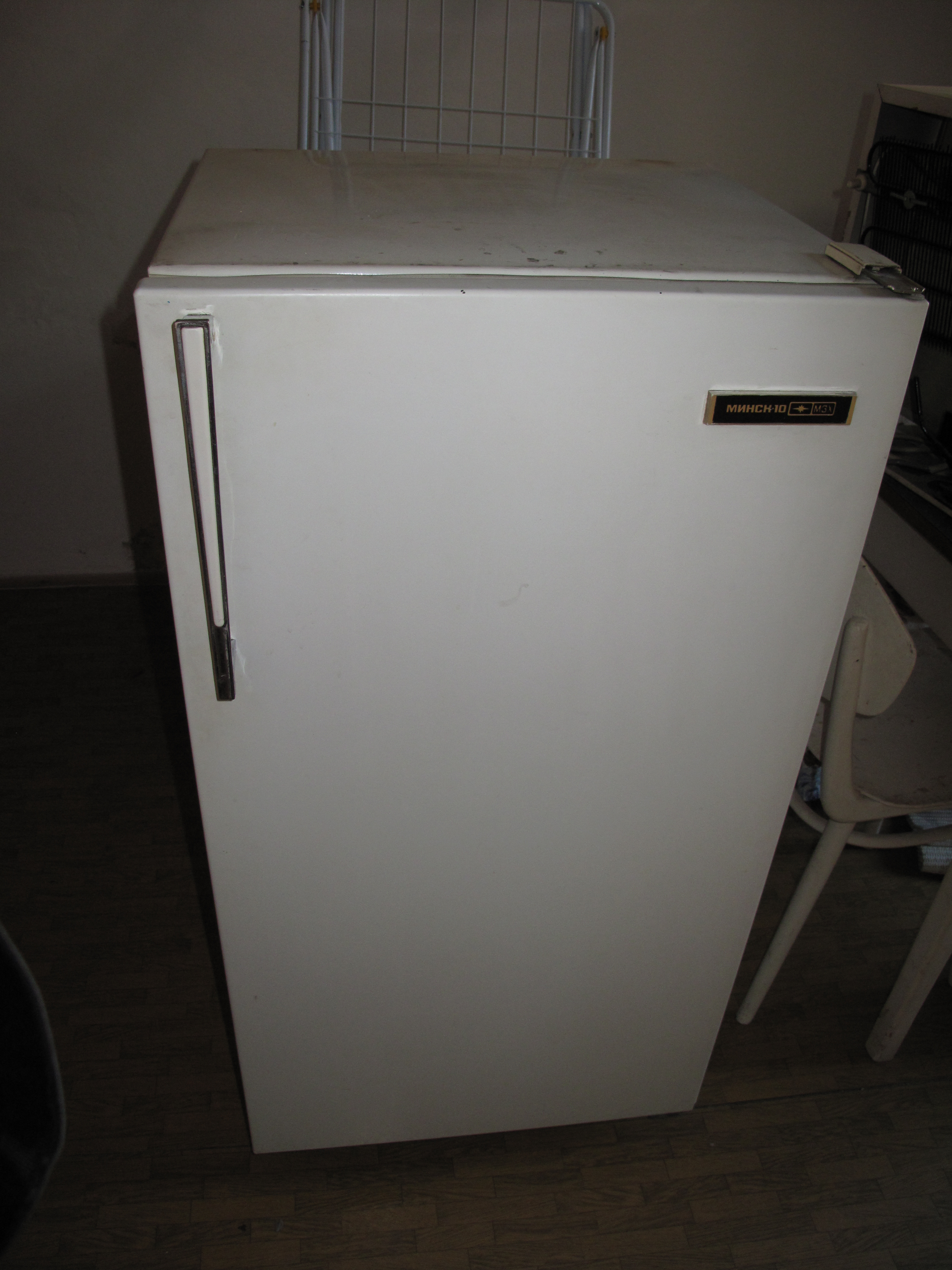
A Minsk Model 10 refrigerator from approximately 1980

In 1973, the Minsk-7 refrigerator was first produced. This model included polyurethane foam insulation, and with it began the export of refrigerators to countries outside the Soviet bloc. A consignment of refrigerators was delivered to Greece in 1973, and in the following years models were exported to France, England, Italy, Belgium, the Netherlands, and Australia, and also to Germany, Sweden, Norway, Finland, Iceland, China, and Spain and elsewhere – a total of 21 countries.

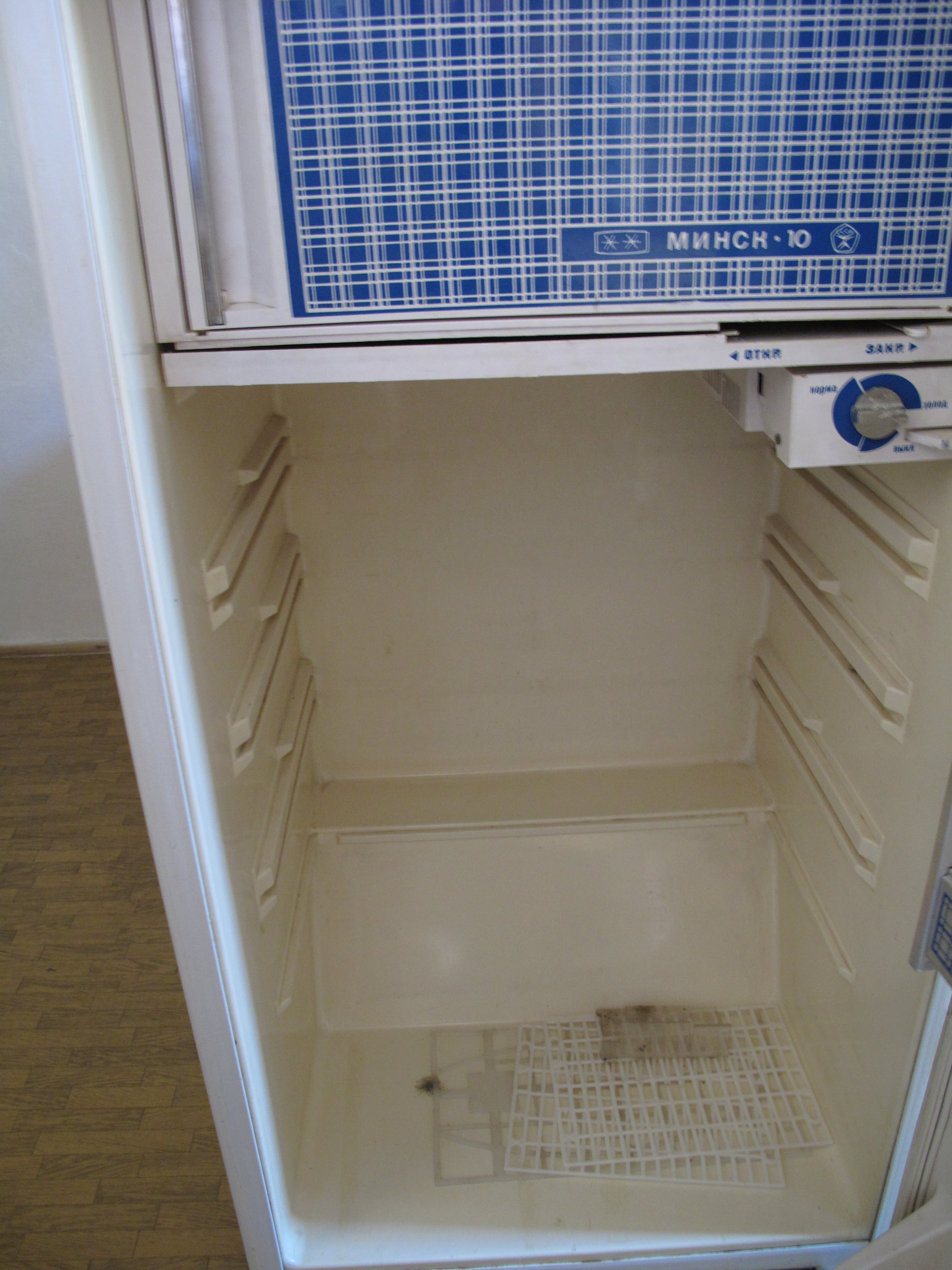
Interior of a Model 10

In 1974, the first Minsk-17 freezer was produced, and in 1976 the Minsk Refrigerator Plant was awarded the Order of the Red Banner of Labour for the design and production of high quality household refrigerators. In 1977 the umbrella organization Atlant was created, consisting of the Minsk Refrigerator Plant as the parent company, and also the Smolensk Refrigerator Plant in Russia and the Alytus Refrigerator Plant and Mažeikiai Compressor Plant, both in Lithuania. In 1979, the factory's one millionth refrigerator was exported, and in 1987, the factory's ten millionth refrigerator was produced.

=== Post-Soviet crisis and survival ===
The collapse of the Soviet Union disrupted Atlant's ties with suppliers, markets, and constituent plants, and almost led to the demise of the company, but it survived and eventually thrived. With the independence of Belarus and the dissolution of the Soviet Union in 1990, Atlant was reduced to just the Minsk Refrigerator Plant, but in that same year the Baranovichi Machine-Tool Plant for the production of compressors for refrigerators and freezers was founded as part of Atlant. In 1993 Atlant was reformed as a corporation consisting of the Minsk Refrigerator Factory and Baranovichi Machine-Tool Plant, and the first batch of compressors was shipped by the Baranovichi Plant. In 1994 Atlant produced its one millionth compressor.

In 1995, preparation for production of refrigerators and freezers with the ozone-friendly refrigerant R134a commenced, and in 1997 production of these types began. Also in 1997, upgrades were made to the Baranovichi Plant's production, transport, storage, and assembly systems. In 1998 the first 700 Series refrigerators were produced, and the first two-compressor refrigerator, the MXM-1704.

Also in 1998, the Belarus State Committee on Standardization, Measurement, and Certification issued the Minsk Refrigerator Plant a certificate of compliance to ISO 9001-96 for the design, manufacture, and servicing of refrigerators and freezers and an ISO 9002 certificate of compliance for quality management systems. In 1999 the Minsk Refrigerator Plant was awarded a quality prize by the government, to be followed by similar prizes in 2002, 2005, 2008, 2010, and other years.

=== 21st century ===
In 2001, the Minsk Refrigerator Plant began producing refrigerated cabinets with glass doors (such as are used in stores to cool and display soda bottles and so forth). Also in 2001, the Baranovichi Plant delivered its first production batch of equipment for plastics processing - the BZST 125/250 injection molding models - and produced its ten millionth compressor. And in the same year, the Republic of Belarus issued the Minsk Refrigerator Plant a certificate of compliance with the ISO 14001-2000 environmental management standard and confirmed the previously issued ISO 9001-96 certificate.

In 2003, the Household Appliances Plant produced the first Atlant washing machines. The Minsk Refrigerator Plant was issued a certificate of compliance with ISO 9001-2000 by the government, and commenced production of small lightweight mini-refrigerators, for use in offices, hotel rooms, etc. In 2004, production began of the New Wave model refrigerators with electronic controls and displays, and the Household Appliances Plant produced the first Atlant ranges with flat glass-ceramic cooktops. In 2005, the Baranovichi Plant produced the first Atlant electric kettles, and in 2006 Atlant produced its 25 millionth refrigerator and 20 millionth compressor.

In 2008, the Baranovichi Plant was commissioned to produce a new line of high-performance compressors under license from the Danish firm Danfoss. The Minsk Refrigerator Plant produced its first built-in refrigerators, the XM 4007, and a Class A energy efficiency model which reduced energy consumption up to 30%. 2009 saw the 50th anniversary of the founding of the Minsk Refrigerator Plant; in the same year, the plant launched a refrigerator line using equipment from the German company Eisenmann which allows refrigerators to be painted in various colors, and produced the Atlant XM 6016 of energy efficiency Class A+.

The Minsk Refrigerator Plant now produces many types of refrigerators and freezers, with various differences in capacity (from 30 to 400 liters), functional capabilities (single-chamber and dual-chamber, with top or bottom location of the freezer, with one or two compressors), and market segment (domestic and commercial). Atlant also produces 26 models of washing machines, two models of electric kettles, and gas and electric stoves. Products under the Atlant brand have long been popular and known far beyond the borders of the Republic of Belarus. As of 2015, Atlant refrigerators are exported to the nine other countries of the Commonwealth of Independent States, nine other countries in Europe, and Mongolia.

The ATLANT trademark wins the first place in the Refrigerator category at the Success Favorites – 2012 International Contest in Ukraine (the contest purpose is to recognize the most successful trademarks in the Ukrainian market). The company's existing quality management system is recertified in the National System for Conformity Attestation, with the certificate issued. For the Minsk Refrigerator Plant and the Household Appliance Plant, the existing quality management system is certified in the German Accreditation System (DAkkS), with the certificate issued. The 63rd Series of refrigerators with the Super fresh box (the freshness zone) is launched in production.

Since April 2013, the CT series compressors designed in-house were launched into production; these compressors are suitable for producing refrigerators with energy efficiency class of A+++.

In 2014, Atlant freezers won the award for Best of the Year in the freezers category at the international Best of the Year competition held in Ukraine.

== Notes ==
1. "Atlant" is merely the transcription of the Cyrillic letters to Latin (this is the method the company prefers). The translation would be to "Atlas" (Ancient Greek "Ἀτλανn" (Atlant) being an alternative form of "Ἄτλας" (Atlas)), or possibly "Atlantic", this being the adjective form of "Atlas".
