= Atalanta (1937 automobile) =

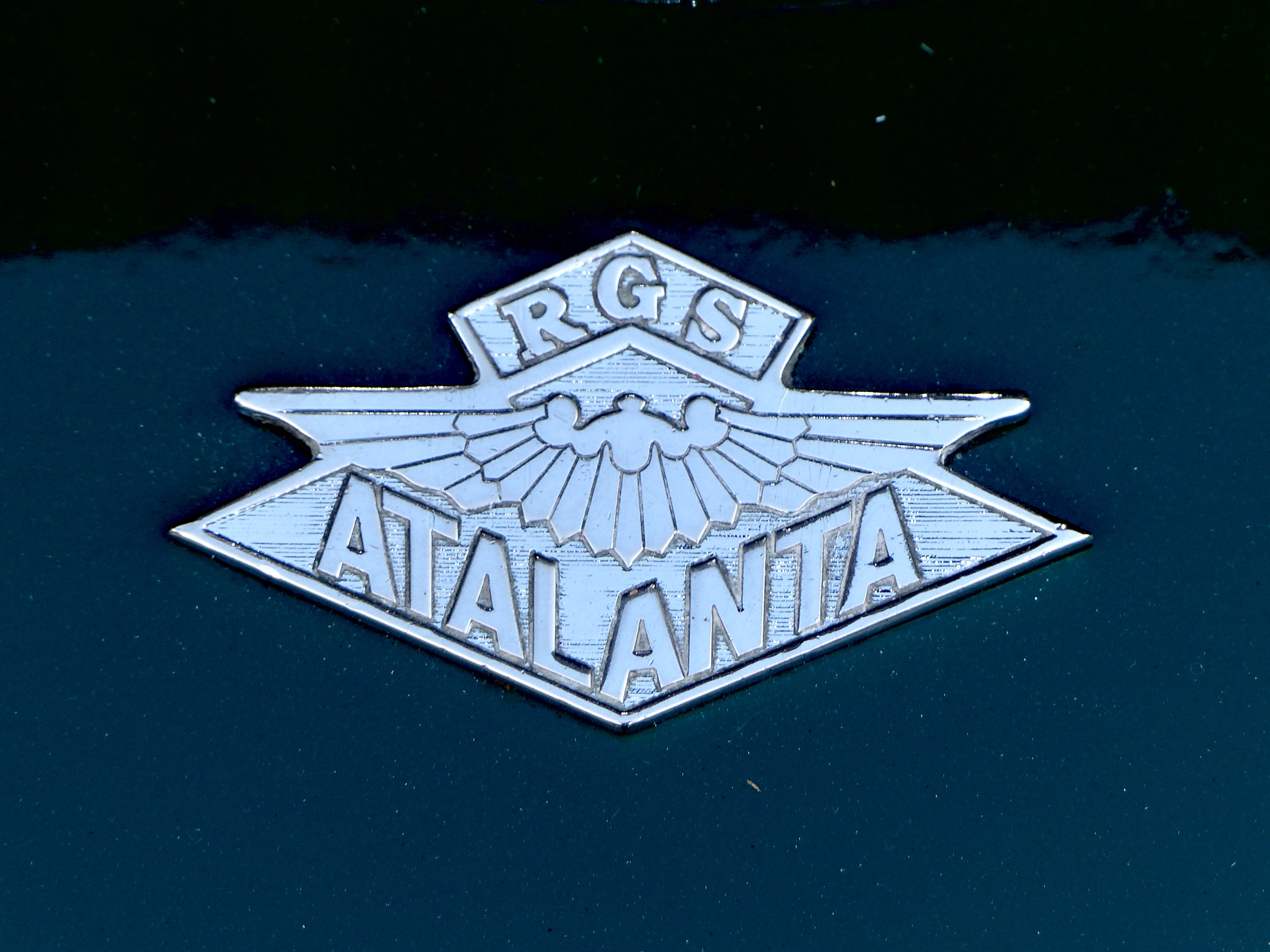

Overview
- Manufacturer: Atalanta Motors Ltd
- Production: 1937-1939 approx 20 made

Body and chassis
- Body style: 2-door sports 2-door coupé 2-door saloon

Powertrain
- Engine: 1.5- or 2-litre straight 4; 4.3-litre V-12
- Transmission: 3- or 4-speed manual

Dimensions
- Wheelbase: 96, 108 and 120 inches (2439, 2743 and 3050 mm)
- Length: 140, 152 and 176 inches (3556, 3861 and 4470 mm)
- Width: 61 and 65 inches (1550 and 1650 mm)

The Atalanta was an English automobile manufactured from 1937 until 1939 by Atalanta Motors Ltd in Staines, Middlesex. Two models were made.

== History ==
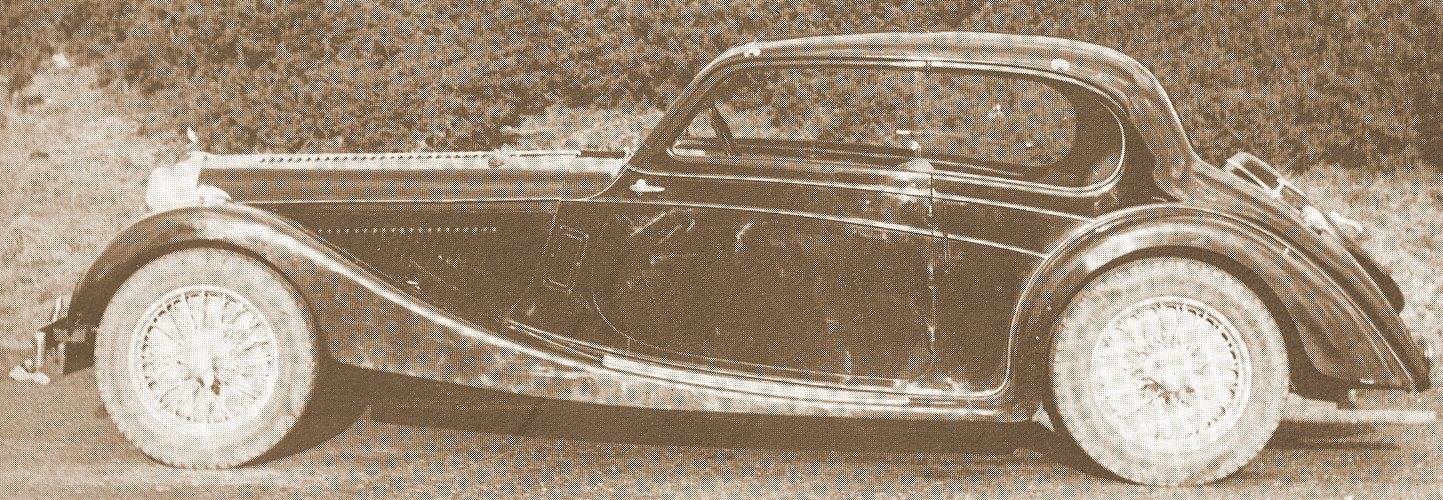
MHV Atalanta V-12 4.3 litre 1939 02

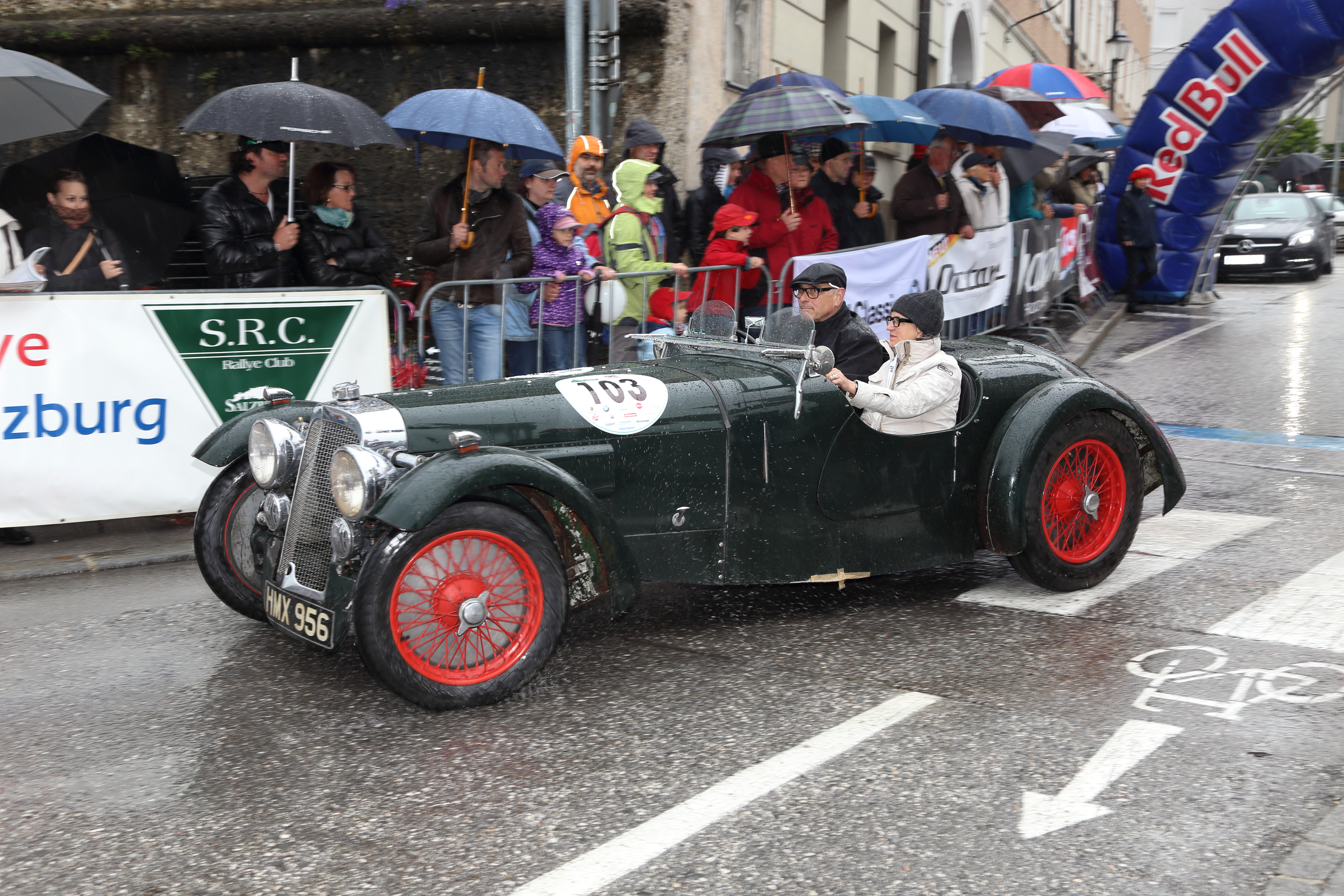
1939 Atalanta 2 litre Roadster ex Midge Wiltby team car; body by Abbott of Farnham.

The 1937 car used Albert Gough's somewhat erratic 4-cylinder overhead-cam 1496 cc 78 bhp and 1996 cc 98 bhp engines with three valves and two spark plugs per cylinder which had been previously fitted to some Frazer Nashes where Gough had worked. An Arnott supercharged version was also available. Three or four-speed gearboxes were offered. The car had a tubular steel chassis and all round independent suspension using coil springs. Two-seat open sports and two-seat drophead coupé bodies built by Abbott were available.

From 1938 the car could be had with a 4·3-litre V-12 Lincoln-Zephyr engine giving 112 bhp which proved to be the more popular. The car had a 3-speed gearbox. A four-seat version on a slightly longer chassis was made as well as the two-seaters.

A 1496cc version raced in the 1938 Le Mans 24 hour race driven by Charles Morrison & Neil Watson (one of the company founders). The car retired with a broken driveshaft. In the late 1930s there was also an open sports version of the Atalanta, with a seven-litre American side-valve engine and an 8-position, gated gear change, and a smaller-engined open sports version using an OHV engine with a blower.

The cars were very expensive and the outbreak of war stopped production after only about 20 cars were made. The company continued in existence making pumps and becoming Atalanta Engineering Ltd.

== RGS Atalanta ==
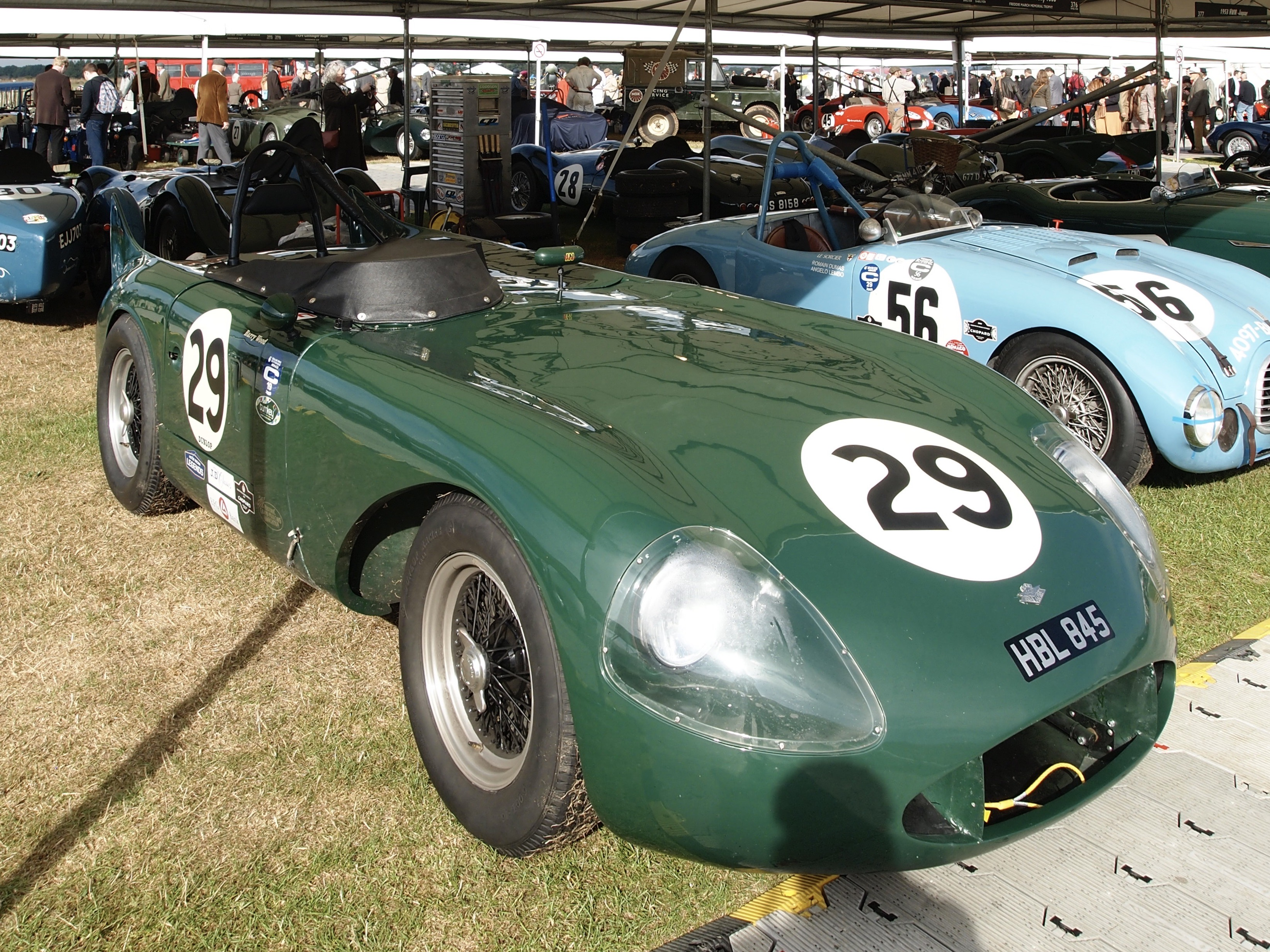
RGS Atalanta, Goodwood Revival Meeting 2013

Richard Gaylard Shattock revived the name after the Second World War with the RGS Atalanta, offering complete cars with fiberglass bodywork or parts kits until 1958. Lea-Francis, Ford and Jaguar engines were used, at least 1 car was equipped with an Aston Martin DB2/4 2.6 L or 3 L triple SU H6 carburettor engine.

== Other cars with the Atalanta name ==
There was another unconnected Atalanta company based in Greenwich, London which built a few 9 hp four-cylinder cars from 1916 to 1917.

Atalanta was a name also used on a car made by the rather mysterious Owen of London, England in about 1910. This company existed between 1899 and 1935 but seems to have made very few if any cars.

Atalanta was also a sports-tourer version of the 20/25 hp Armstrong Siddeley line, sold between 1936 and 1938.

A new sports car manufactured by Atalanta Motors Ltd of Staffordshire was shown in 2012 and at the 2014 Hampton Court Palace Concours d'Elegance.

== See also ==
- Lewes Speed Trials
- List of car manufacturers of the United Kingdom
