= Atalanta (1915 automobile) =

The Atalanta was an English car manufactured in Greenwich, southeast London (then part of Kent until 1941) from 1915 to 1917. One of a number of light car companies to start business during the First World War, the Atalanta was one of the latest startups. The 9 hp light car sold for £195 with a non-proprietary four-cylinder 1097 cc engine.

The wartime economy was not good to them, and the business closed their doors by February 1917.

The company had no connection with the better known Atalanta of Staines, Middlesex made between 1937 and 1939.

== See also ==
- List of car manufacturers of the United Kingdom
