= Atalanta (1811 ship) =

History

United Kingdom
- Name: Atalanta
- Namesake: Atalanta
- Builder: William Smith & Co, Newcastle-upon-Tyne
- Launched: 2 March 1811
- Fate: Broken up circa 1831

General characteristics
- Tons burthen: 34227/94, or 343 (bm)

Atalanta was launched at Newcastle-upon-Tyne in 1811. She initially sailed as a government transport, sailing to the Indian Ocean. She also captured an American vessel after the outbreak of war with the United States. She then became a West Indiaman, and later traded with Sierra Leone and Madeira. She made one voyage to Bombay, sailing under a licence from the British East India Company (EIC). She was broken up circa 1831.

== Career ==
Atalanta first appeared in Lloyd's Register (LR) in 1812.

Year	Master	Owner	Trade	Source
1811	Davidson	Levit	London–Cape of Good Hope	LR

In December 1812 the transport Atalanta, Davidson, master, sent into the Cape of Good Hope the American whaler Ocean, of Nantucket. (Note: Ocean had sailed from Nantucket in 1811, under the command of Absalom Coffin.) On 29 June Atalanta arrived at the Cape from Mauritius.

Year	Master	Owner	Trade	Source
1816	Davidson; I.Coles	J.Levitt; Johnston	London transport London–Jamaica	RS
1816	Davidson; I.Coles	R.Bayne; D.Johnston	London–Gothenburg; London–Jamaica	LR
1818	T.Coles; M.Corney	Johnston & Co.	London–Jamaica	LR
1819	M.Corney; Wilson	Johnston & Co.	London–Jamaica	LR
1822	Wilson	Meaburn	London–Jamaica	LR
1823	Wilson; Penman	Meaburn	London–Jamaica	LR
1826	Penman; Johnson	Meaburn	London–Elsinore; London–Bombay	LR; small repairs 1825

In 1813 the EIC had lost its monopoly on the trade between India and Britain. British ships were then free to sail to India or the Indian Ocean under a licence from the EIC. Captain W.Johnson sailed for Bombay on 26 April 1826.

Year	Master	Owner	Trade	Source
1827	Johnson; Tate	Meaburn	London–Bombay; London–Sierra Leone	LR; small repairs 1825
1829	Tate	Meaburn	London–Madeira	LR; small repairs 1825

== Fate ==
LR for 1832 carried the annotation "Broke up" by Atalanta's name.
