= Atlante =

Atlante or Atlantes may refer to:

- Atlantes, the plural of Atlas (architecture), an architectural support in the form of a man
- Atlante San Alejo, a Salvadoran football club
- Atlante F.C., a Mexican football club
- Atlante (private equity fund)
- Atlante-class tugboat
- Atlante (keelboat), a French sailboat design
- Atlantes (sorcerer), a fictional character in various chansons de geste and in the poem Orlando Furioso

== See also ==
- Atalante (disambiguation)
- Atlant (disambiguation)
- Atlanta (disambiguation)
- Atlantean (disambiguation)
