= Atlantean =

As an adjective, Atlantean (or Atlantian) means "of or pertaining to Atlas or Atlantis".

Atlantean may also refer to:

- Atlantean figures, a type of ancient artifacts
- Atlantean (documentary series), a trilogy of TV films discussing the origins of the European coastal peoples
- Atlanteans (DC Comics), a fictional species in the DC Universe
- Atlanteans (Marvel Comics), a fictional species in the Marvel Universe
- Leyland Atlantean, a model of double-decker bus
- Atlantean language, a constructed language created for Disney's film Atlantis: The Lost Empire
- Atlantean Scion, a fictional device in the game Tomb Raider
- Ancient (Stargate), a race in the Stargate universe, also known as Atlanteans or Lanteans

== See also ==
- Atlantan, an inhabitant of Atlanta
