= Atlanta, Nova Scotia =

Community in Nova Scotia, Canada

Coordinates: 45°8′57″N 64°30′30″W

Atlanta in Nova Scotia

Atlanta is a community in the Canadian province of Nova Scotia. Located in Kings County, it was named after the Atlanta Creek in the northern reaches of this hamlet.
