= USS Atlanta =

Five United States Navy ships have borne and one future ship will bear the name Atlanta, after the city of Atlanta, Georgia:

- USS Atlanta (1861), was a Confederate ironclad converted from a blockade runner, named CSS Atlanta, captured in 1863
- USS Atlanta (1884), was a protected cruiser, launched in 1884 and decommissioned in 1912
- USS Atlanta (CL-51), a light cruiser, was commissioned in 1941 and sunk in November 1942 at the Naval Battle of Guadalcanal
- USS Atlanta (CL-104 / IX-304), a light cruiser, was commissioned in 1944, served in World War II and in the 1960s was used as an explosives test ship
- USS Atlanta (SSN-712), was a Los Angeles-class nuclear attack submarine commissioned 1982 and inactivated in 1999
- USS Atlanta (SSN-813), is a future Virginia-class nuclear attack submarine
