= HMS Courageux (1800) =

Ship of the line of the Royal Navy

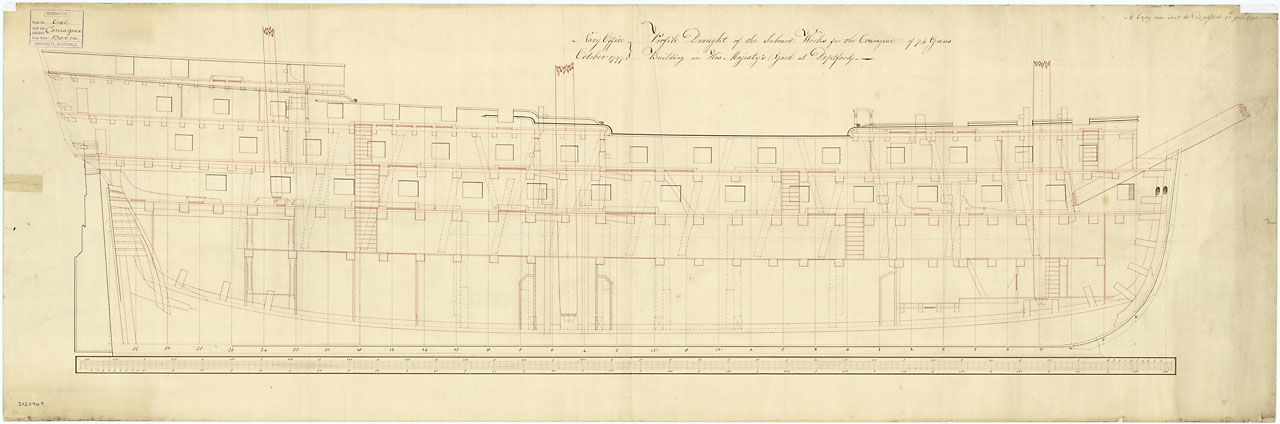
- Plan of HMS Courageux by John Henslow in 1797

History

Great Britain
- Name: HMS Courageux
- Ordered: 6 November 1794
- Builder: Deptford Dockyard
- Laid down: October 1797
- Launched: 26 March 1800
- Fate: Broken up, 1832

General characteristics
- Class & type: 74-gun third rate ship of the line
- Tons burthen: 1772 (bm)
- Length: 181 ft (55.2 m) (gundeck)
- Beam: 47 ft 1 in (14.4 m)
- Depth of hold: 19 ft 10 in (6.0 m)
- Propulsion: Sails
- Sail plan: Full-rigged ship
- Armament: Gundeck: 28 × 32-pounder guns; Upper gundeck: 30 × 24-pounder guns; QD: 12 × 9-pounder guns; Fc: 4 × 9-pounder guns

HMS Courageux was a 74-gun third rate ship of the line of the Royal Navy, launched on 26 March 1800 at Deptford. She was designed by Sir John Henslow as one of the large class 74-gun ships, and was the only ship built to her draught. Unlike the middling and common class 74-gun ships, which carried 18-pounder long guns, as a large 74-gun ship, Courageux carried 24-pounders on her upper gun deck.

On 3 January 1804 Atalanta had to put into Dartmouth after Courageux had run into her.

At the end of January 1801, a French squadron under Admiral Honoré Ganteaume comprising seven ships-of-the-line and two frigates, and carrying 5,000 troops, escaped from the port of Brest. It was spotted on 27 January by a British frigate which conveyed the news to Plymouth on 3 February. Believing its destination to be the West Indies, a similar sized force, under Sir Robert Calder was sent in pursuit. As one of the fastest two-deckers available at the time, Courageux was selected to take part in this unnecessary expedition.

When the Peace of Amiens broke down in May 1803, Courageux, was part of Samuel Hood's squadron in the Leeward Islands and took part in an attack on St Lucia in June. She left Barbados on 20 June in the company of Hood's 74-gun flagship HMS Centaur, the frigates Argo and Chichester, and the sloops Hornet and Cyane. They were joined the following morning by HMS Emerald and the 18-gun sloop Osprey. The squadron anchored in Choc Bay at around 11:00, the troops were landed by 17:00 and half an hour after, the town of Castries capitulated. The island's main fortress, Morne-Fortunée, refused to surrender so the British stormed it at 04:00 on 22 June, and by 04:30, this too was in British hands. Following this comparatively easy take-over, the British force invaded Tobago, which surrendered on 1 July.

On 1 January 1804 a convoy of leaving Portsmouth for the West Indies. On 1 February 43 vessels returned to Plymouth, together with their escort, Courageux.

In mid-1804, Courageaux escorted a convoy from St Helena back to Britain. The convoy consisted of the East Indiamen City of London, Ceylon, Calcutta, and Wyndham, two vessels from the South Seas, Lively and Vulture, and the ship Rolla, which had transported convicts to New South Wales. (Note: Lively was a French ship launched in 1787 but captured in 1796. She was now working as a South Seas whaler under the command of Captain Magnus Smith and under ownership of David Bennett.) On the way the convoy ran into severe weather with the result that Prince of Wales, which had also left St Helena with the rest, foundered with the loss of all on board; this had been her maiden voyage.

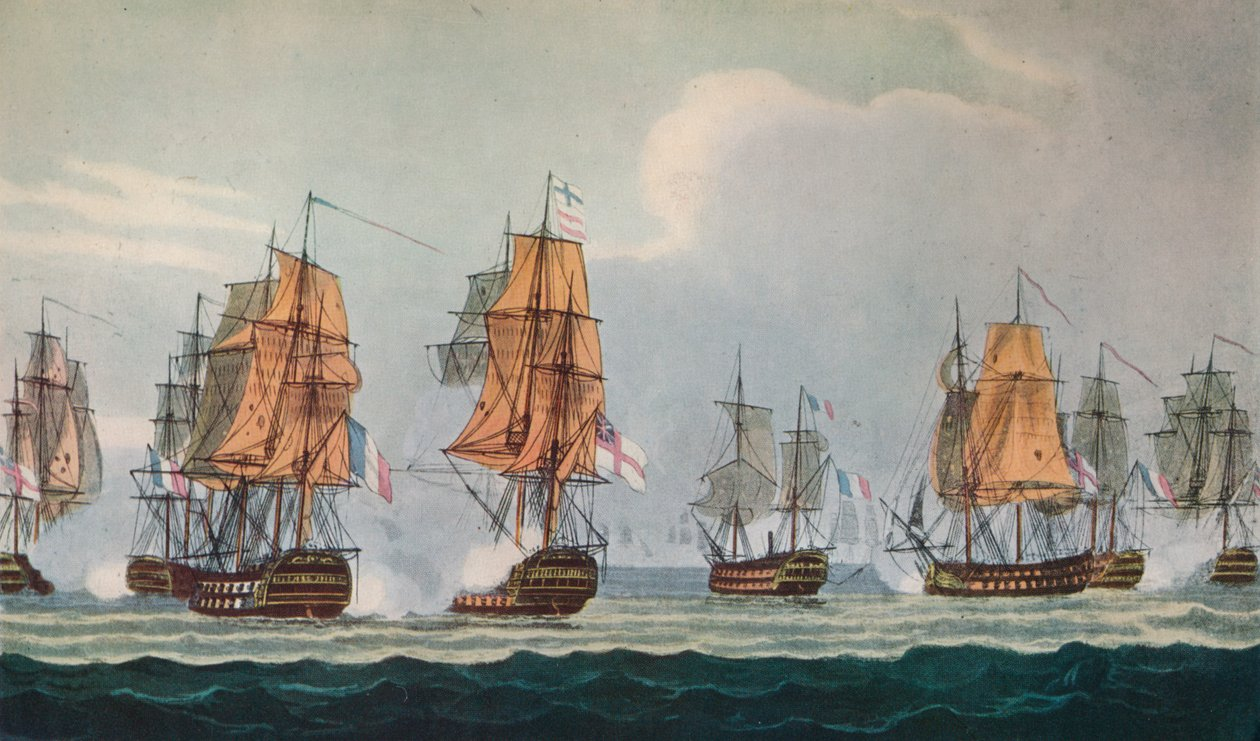
Sir Richard Strachan's Action - 4 November 1805, Courageaux seen second right

On 4–5 November 1805 she was involved in the Battle of Cape Ortegal (Sir Richard Strachan's Action).

In 1806 and 1807 Courageux is known to have been under the command of James Bissett.

Shortly after the outbreak of the War of 1812, on 12 August, Courageaux shared in the seizure of several American vessels: Cuba, Caliban, Edward, Galen, Halcyon, and Cygnet. (Note: Prize money was paid in November 1815. A first-class share was worth £360 2s 3d; a sixth-class share, that of an ordinary seaman, was worth £3 11s 7d.)

== Fate ==
Courageux was placed on harbour service in 1814, and was broken up in 1832.
