= TSS Atalanta =

British passenger ship

History
- Name: 1907–1915: TSS Atalanta; 1915–1919: TSS Atalanta III; 1919–: TSS Atalanta
- Operator: 1907–1910: London and South Western Railway; 1910–1923: Great Western Railway; 1923–: Royal Mail Steam Packet Company
- Port of registry: (United Kingdom)
- Ordered: January 1907
- Builder: Gourlay Brothers, Dundee
- Laid down: 29 January 1907
- Launched: 26 April 1907
- Fate: Scuttled 11 June 1940

General characteristics
- Tonnage: 550 gross register tons (GRT)
- Length: 170 feet (52 m)
- Beam: 32 feet (9.8 m)
- Draught: 16.5 feet (5.0 m)

TSS Atalanta was a passenger vessel built for the London and South Western Railway in 1907.

== History ==
She was built by Gourlay Brothers in Dundee for the London and South Western Railway. She was launched on 26 April 1907 by Miss Drummond, daughter of Mr Drummond, chief engineer of the Highland Railway Company, in the presence of her father and Mr. Douglas Drummond, chief engineer of the London and South Western Railway Company; Mr Drummond, jun. She was employed as a tender until 1910 when she was sold to the Great Western Railway. In 1913 she was in collision with a submerged rock near Bolt Head in Devon, when she was on an excursion trip from Plymouth to Torquay.

During the First World War she was hired by the Admiralty and used as a rescue tug around the Isles of Scilly. She was renamed Atalanta III.

She returned to Plymouth after the war but was laid up out of use until she was sold in 1923 to the Royal Mail Steam Packet Company, who purchased her as a tender for Bermuda.

The ship was scuttled on 11 June 1940 at Le Havre under the name La Brettoniere.
