= Atalanta (1799 ship) =

History

Great Britain
- Builder: Bermuda
- Launched: 1799
- Captured: Circa August 1804

General characteristics
- Tons burthen: 332 (bm)
- Complement: 1799:40; 1801:40
- Armament: 1799: 18 × 6-pounder guns; 1801:18 × 6-pounder guns; 1804:10 × 6-pounder guns

Atalanta was built in Bermuda in 1799. She sailed to London and then between 1800 and 1802 she made two complete voyages as a slave ship. New owners sailed her as a West Indiaman. She suffered a minor maritime incident in 1803. A French privateer captured her in 1804.

== Career ==
1st enslaving voyage (1800–1801): Captain John Reddie acquired a letter of marque on 29 November 1799. He sailed from London on 20 January 1800, bound for West Africa. Atalanta acquired her captives at Malembo and then the Congo River. She arrived at Kingston, Jamaica on 8 October with 308 captives. She arrived back at London on 26 January 1801. She returned to London with Cummings, master.

2nd enslaving voyage (1801–1802): Captain Thomas Cummins acquired a letter of marque on 17 March 1801. Captain Cummings sailed from London on 2 April 1801. Atalanta acquired her captives at Malembo. She arrived at Kingston on 8 March 1802 with 280 captives. She sailed from Kingston on 19 July and arrived back at London on 12 September 1802.

Year	Master	Owner	Trade	Source & notes
1804	Cummins; W.Jenkins	Atkins & Co.	London–Africa	LR; damage repaired 1804
1805	W.Jenkins	Atkins & Co.	Dartmouth–Jamaica	LR; damage repaired 1804

On 23 December 1803 Atalanta, Jenkins, master, sailed for Jamaica from Gravesend. On 3 January 1804 she had to put into Dartmouth after the 74-gun third rate HMS Courageux had run into her. On 3 June Atalanta was off Crooked Island, Bahamas.

== Fate ==
Lloyd's List reported in August 1804 that a French privateer had captured Atalanta, Jenkins, master, and taken her into Bordeaux. Atalanta had been on her way back to London from Jamaica.

The entry for Atalanta in the 1805 volume of Lloyd's Register carried the annotation "Captured" by her name.
