= Atalanti Maria Tasouli =

Greek basketball player

Atalanti Maria Tasouli (born 28 September 1976) is a Greek former basketball player who competed in the 2004 Summer Olympics.
