= Atalanta, Santa Catarina =

Coordinates: 27.42°S 49.7808°W

Atalanta
- Municipality
- Flag Coat of arms
- Interactive map of Atalanta
- Country: Brazil
- Region: South
- State: Santa Catarina
- Mesoregion: Vale do Itajai

Population (2020)
  - Total: 3,195
- Time zone: UTC -3

Atalanta is a municipality in the state of Santa Catarina in the South region of Brazil.

The city is named in honor of the football club Atalanta Bergamasca Calcio, from Bergamo in Italy, which in 1963 had won the Coppa Italia. The name was suggested at a meeting just before the city's official founding by settler José Paglioli, who claimed to have grandparents from "Atalanta" in Italy, whose club had just won that year's Coppa Italia. Although it was later discovered that this was a mistake and that Paglioli confused Bergamo with the city's club, Atalanta.

== See also ==
- List of municipalities in Santa Catarina
