= Atlant (book) =

Atlant was the first atlas of the world in Slovene. It was published three centuries after the publication of the first Slovene book (1550), Catechismus, by Primož Trubar, and the publication of the first atlas ever, Theatre of the World (1570), by Abraham Ortelius. It was a means of placing Slovenes and Slovene on a world map. It consisted of six sets of three sheets, published in 1869, 1871, 1872, 1874, 1875, and 1877, altogether 18 maps. The geographical names were prepared by the lawyer Matej Cigale (1819-1889). A number of foreign names were translated into Slovene or Slovenised for the first time.
