= Atalanta Motors =

British car company

Atalanta Motors Ltd
- Type: Private
- Industry: Automotive
- Founded: 2011; 15 years ago
- Founder: Martyn Corfield
- Key people: Martyn Corfield (founder and CEO)
- Website: atalantamotors.com

Atalanta Motors is a British car company created in 2011 by Martyn Corfield to relaunch the dormant 1930s Atalanta which stopped production due to the war after a production run of only 21 cars.

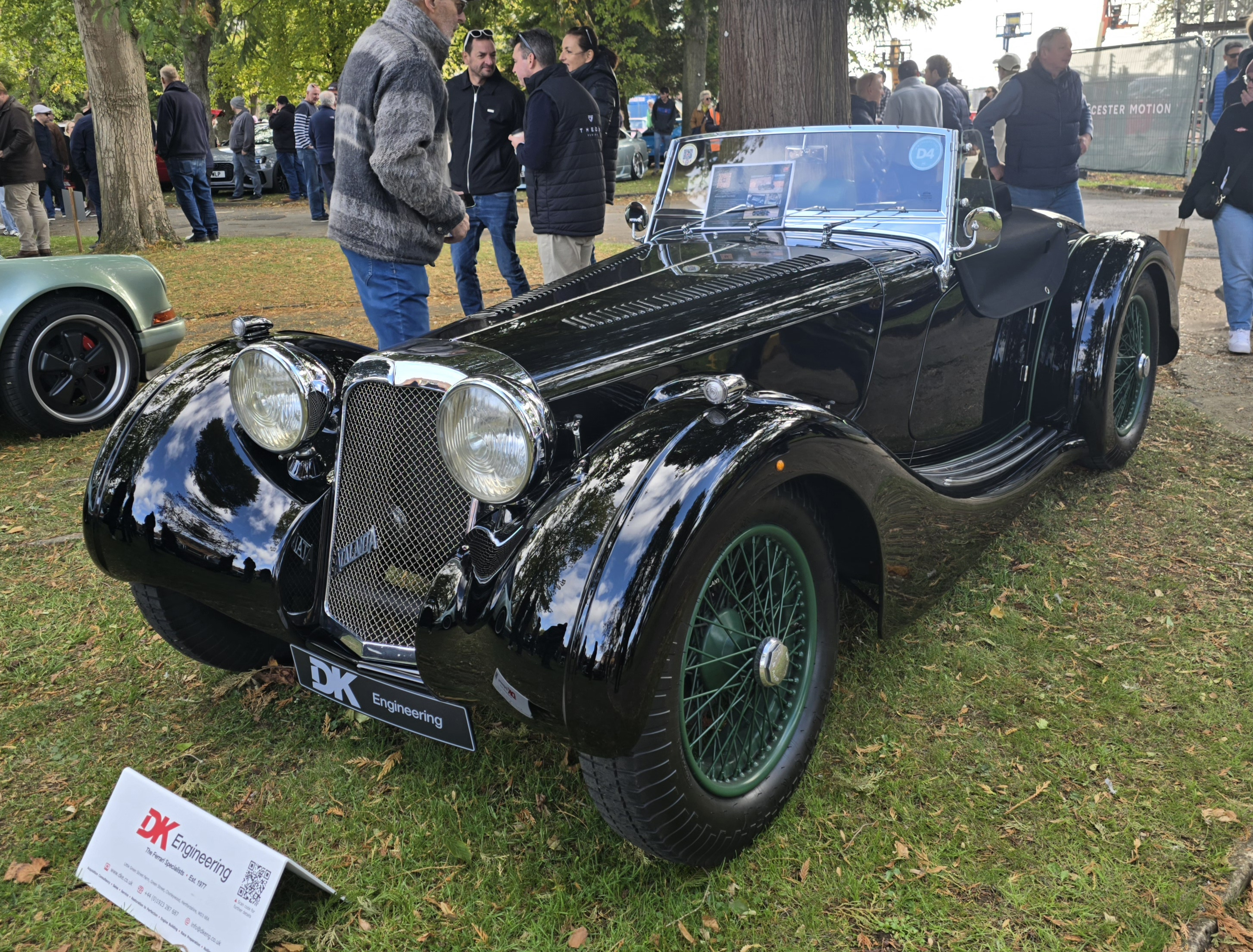
Atalanta Sports

Initially announcing the rebirth of the marque in 2012 with the retro-designed Sports Tourer, Atalanta Motors displayed another car at the 2014 Concours of Elegance at Hampton Court Palace, but production models have yet to be announced. The production is limited to 10 cars a year.

The new Atalanta is built from hand-beaten aluminium panels over an ash wood chassis, with a claimed 90 per cent of the components designed and engineered in-house. The Atalanta features disc brakes, rack and pinion steering and is powered by a 2.5-litre 4-cylinder engine producing 214 bhp (160 kW; 217 PS).
