= George Elers =

- Elers, as he is pictured on the inside cover of the first edition of his collected memoirs.
- Born: 14 May 1777; Great Russell Street, Bloomsbury Square, London
- Died: 1842 (aged 64–65)
- Occupation: British Army officer

George Elers (14 May 1777 – 1842) was a captain in the Suffolk Regiment. The events of his life are preserved in his collected memoirs, which were posthumously published as The Memoirs of George Elers.

== Early life ==
Elers was the son of Lieutenant Paul George Elers and Elizabeth Debonnaire. He was the second of three children, with the eldest, Hungerford Richard, having preceded him by four years, and the younger, Edward, arriving four years after George himself. Elers was born at Great Russell Street, Bloomsbury Square and grew up living in Filkins Hall. As a child, Elers found he had a greater love for his aunt than his parents as he spent much of his time with the former. At the age of eight, he attended a school in Chiswick for a time until he fell ill with measles and the head, a Mr. Crawford, died of dropsy. Elers then became a half-boarder at a school in Soho Square, overseen by Dr. Barrow. At the age of fourteen, he developed an attachment with his cousin, Sophia, whom he spent a holiday with in Oxford, but she did not accept his advances and died of tuberculosis a short time after they parted.

== 12th Foot ==
After Hungerford join the 43rd Regiment and Edward the navy, George was offered a lieutenancy in the 12 Foot. His commission was officially dated as the 12 April 1796. It was at this time that he first met Colonel Aston who "until his lamented death, ever treated me like a father". Soon enough, he was bound for Madras, India and not long after arrival did a spate of duelling brake out. Elers himself sent a challenge in response to an insult, but the offender sent him a satisfactory apology.

Elers was moved to Tanjore at one point and then onto Vellum, a military station seven miles from the former. There he bore witness to the practice of suttee, much to his distress. He would later recall in his memoirs how he had many a chance to save the woman, but British policy of none-interference meant that he would have faced scandal had he tried to do so.

Elers was still at Vellum when the old Raja was deposed in a bloodless revolution and replaced by the younger Suffrajeh. He then held a dinner, as was English custom, which Elers attended. Fearing that the Tipu Sultan would not accept new regulations that were being enforced, the 12th Foot was moved to a military base called Arnee. It was a short time after this that Colonel Aston was killed in a duel, much to the grievance of Elers.

In May 1803, Elers was promoted to the rank of captain, a commission which he felt should have come a year sooner. Throughout his time in the 12th Foot, Elers had a number of encounters with the famed Arthur Wellesley, so much so that his memoirs go into much detail to describe the many encounters between the two. Sometime after his promotion to captain, Elers dined with Lord Wellesley and sat at his right hand.
