= Atalanti Island (Attica) =

Island off the coast of Attica, Greece

Native name: Νησίδα Αταλάντη
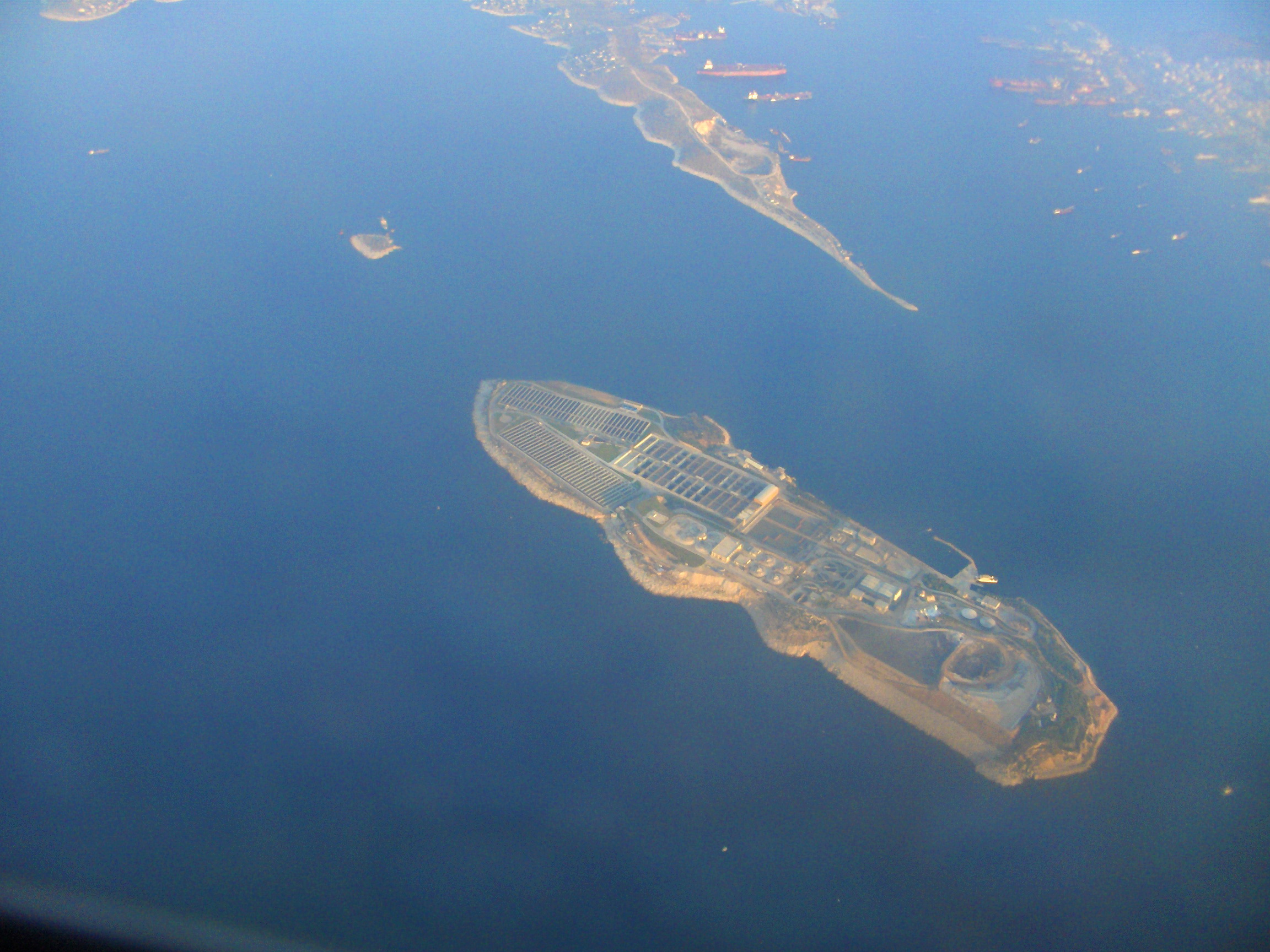
- Interactive map of Atalanti Island (Attica)

Geography
- Coordinates: 37°56′06″N 23°34′21″E
- Adjacent to: Saronic Gulf

Administration
- Greece

Atalanti Island (Greek: Νησίδα Αταλάντη, romanized: Nisída Atalánti) is an island off the western coast of Attica region, between Salamis Island and the port of Athens, Piraeus. Anciently, the island was called Atalanta or Atalante (Αταλάντη).
