= Atalanti Island =

Small uninhabited island in the North Euboean Gulf

Atalanti
Native name: Αταλαντονήσι
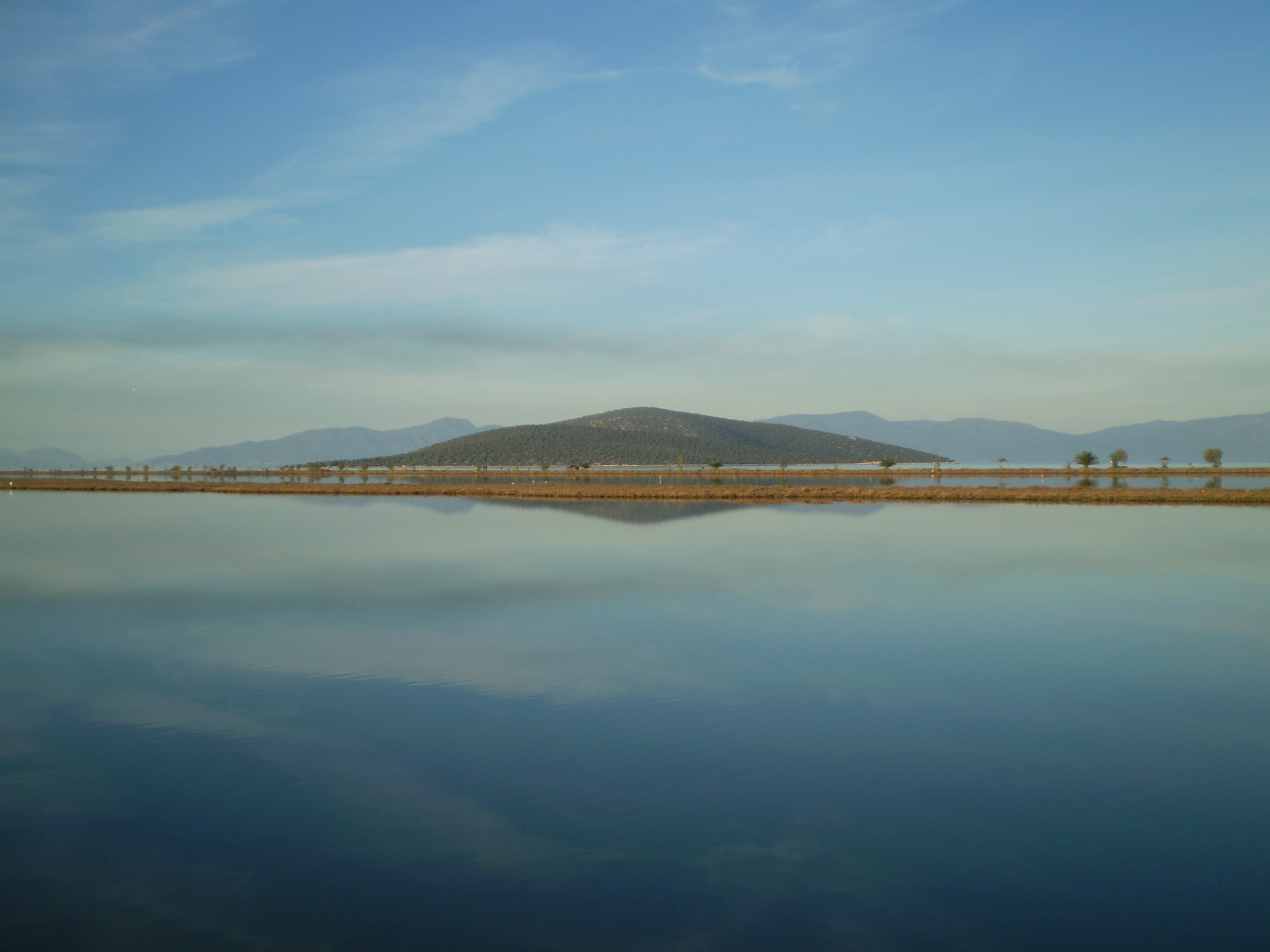

- Location within Greece

Geography
- Coordinates: 38.675°N 23.096°E
- Highest elevation: 129 m (423 ft)

Administration
- Greece
- Region: Central Greece
- Regional unit: Phthiotis

Demographics
- Population: 0 (2011)

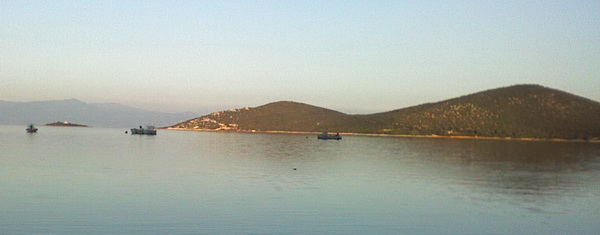
view of the island

Atalanti (Greek: Αταλάντη) or Atalantonisi (Αταλαντονήσι) or Talandonísi (Ταλαντονήσι) is a small uninhabited island in the North Euboean Gulf, about 600 m off the coast near the town Atalanti, Phthiotis, Greece. There are several small islets next to Atalanti island, including the islet of Agios Nikolaos.

Anciently, the island was known as Atalanta or Atalante (Ancient Greek: Ἀταλάντη). It was noted by ancient geographers and historians as a small island off Locris, in the Opuntian Gulf, said to have been torn asunder from the mainland by an earthquake. In the first year of the Peloponnesian War this previously uninhabited island was fortified by the Athenians to prevent Locrian pirates attacking Euboea. In the sixth year of the war a part of the Athenian works was destroyed by the sea, with half the ships on the beach destroyed. Thucydides reports that following an earthquake, the sea receded from the shore before returning in a huge wave. Citing similar events at Peparethus and Orobiae, he suggests that earthquakes and such "sea events" are linked—we now know that such tsunami are in fact caused by earthquakes. In 421 BCE, the Peace of Nicias returned Atalanta to Sparta. Aside from Thucydides, the island is noted by Strabo, Diodorus, Pausanias, Livy, Pliny the Elder, Seneca, and Stephanus of Byzantium.
