= John Lade (disambiguation) =

John Lade was a racehorse breeder.

John Lade may also refer to:

- Sir John Lade, 1st Baronet (1st creation) (1662–1740), MP for Southwark
- Sir John Lade, 2nd Baronet (1721–1747) of the Lade Baronets
- Sir John Lade, 1st Baronet (2nd creation) (c. 1731–1759), MP for Camelford
- Sir John Lade, 2nd Baronet (1759–1838) of the Lade Baronets
