= Lade baronets of Warbleton (2nd creation, 1758) =

Escutcheon of the Lade baronets

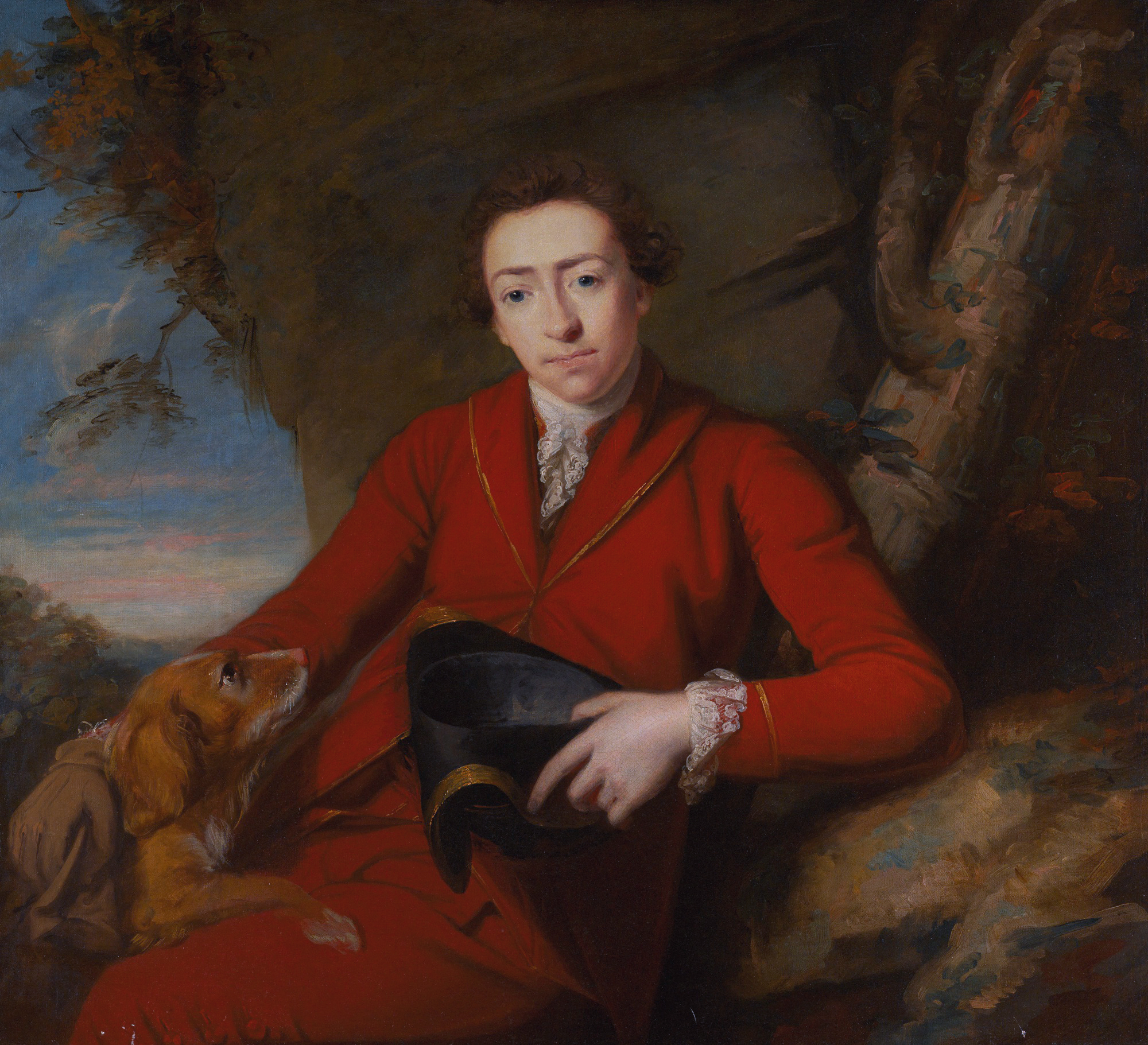
Sir John Lade, 2nd Baronet, portrait by Joshua Reynolds

The Lade baronetcy, of Warbleton in the County of Sussex, was created secondly in the Baronetage of Great Britain on 17 March 1758 for John Lade, formerly Inskip, of Uckfield. He had been MP for Camelford from 1754. He had inherited in 1740 the fortune of the 1st Baronet of the 1st creation, and changed his surname. He was the son of Edward Inskip and his first wife Philadelphia Lade, daughter of Vincent Lade, elder brother of John Lade, and died in 1759, after a fall from a horse. He had married Mary Thrale, the sister of Henry Thrale, and the 2nd Baronet was a posthumous son.

On the death without issue of the 2nd Baronet in 1838, the baronetcy became extinct.

== Lade baronets, of Warbleton (1758) ==
- Sir John Lade, 1st Baronet (c. 1731–1759)
- Sir John Lade, 2nd Baronet (1759–1838)

== Notes ==
Baronetage of Great Britain
Preceded by Smith baronets	Lade baronets of Warbleton; 17 March 1758	Succeeded by Wilmot baronets
