= Lade baronets of Warbleton (1st creation, 1731) =

Escutcheon of the Lade baronets

The Lade baronetcy, of Warbleton in the County of Sussex, was first created in the Baronetage of Great Britain on 11 March 1731 for John Lade (sometimes spelled "Ladd"), a prosperous Southwark brewer and MP for Southwark. He was unmarried.

By the terms of the patent, the 1st Baronet's niece's third son succeeded as 2nd Baronet, and changed his surname from Whithorne to Lade. He died without issue, when the baronetcy became extinct.

== Lade baronets, of Warbleton (1st creation, 1731) ==
- Sir John Lade, 1st Baronet (1662–1740)
- Sir John Lade, 2nd Baronet (1721–1747)

== Extended family ==
The 1st Baronet left his fortune to another great-nephew, John Inskip of Uckfield. He became the 1st Baronet of the 2nd creation.

== Notes ==
Baronetage of Great Britain
Preceded by Robinson baronets	Lade baronets of Warbleton; 11 March 1731	Succeeded by Wynne baronets
