= Meggott =

Meggott is an English surname. Notable people with the surname include:

- George Meggott (1669–1723), MP for Southwark
- John Meggott (1714–1789), MP also known as John Elwes
