= Edmund Halsey =

British brewer and Whig politician

Edmund Halsey (died 1729), of St. Saviour's, Southwark, Surrey and Stoke Poges, Buckinghamshire, was a British brewer and Whig politician who sat in the House of Commons between 1712 and 1729. He enjoyed a rags-to-riches career, from working as a ‘miller’s boy’ at St. Albans to becoming the owner of one of the largest breweries in the London area.

Halsey left his home town of St Albans and went to London ‘with 4s.6d. only in his pocket’, and found work at James Child's Anchor Brewery in Southwark. He began by sweeping the yards, but was promoted to become clerk of the brewery's counting-house. He eventually married James Child's only daughter Anne Child on 17 October 1693, and became a partner in the business. By May 1696 he had already garnered enough wealth to loan £1,000 to the crown. When Child died in September 1696, he assumed complete control of the brewery. By that time Halsey may have already become involved in local politics, for the elections committee reported in December 1696 on the testimony of a ‘Mr Halsey’ on a disputed election. He became Freeman of the Brewers’ Company in 1697.

Halsey was put forward as a candidate in December 1711 for Southwark, which had several brewers supporting the Whig cause. He was returned as Whig Member of Parliament for Southwark at the by-election on 12 January 1712, although he actually finished 16 votes behind his opponent, Sir George Mathews. Mathews petitioned and as the committee reported several irregularities at the poll, the House ruled in favour of Mathews, and Halsey was unseated on 7 February 1712.

Halsey became master of the Brewers Company in 1715. He was returned as MP for Buckingham at a by-election on 30 November 1717 through the influence of his son-in-law, Sir Richard Temple, 4th Baronet. In the House he supported the administration. He was a governor of St Thomas’ Hospital by 1719 and a director of the South Sea Company in 1721, holding both positions for the rest of his life. At the 1722 British general election he was returned again in a contest for Southwark. His local interest was probably increased by the growing success of his brewery, and in 1724 he spent £12,000 on the purchase of the manor of Stoke Poges. He was returned unopposed for Southwark at the 1727 British general election.

Halsey died in August 1729. Two sons predeceased him and he left an only daughter, Anne, Viscountess Cobham, who inherited the Stoke Poges property. His widow died in 1741. The brewing business was sold for a reported £30,000 to Ralph Thrale of Streatham, his brewery clerk and son of his sister Anne who had married Ralph Thrale of Offley, Hertfordshire. The Anchor brewery served as a platform for Thrale to launch his own and his son Henry’s. political careers.

Parliament of Great Britain
Preceded by Sir Charles Cox; John Cholmley	Member of Parliament for Southwark; 1712; With: Sir Charles Cox	Succeeded by Sir Charles Cox; Sir George Matthews
Preceded by Alexander Denton; Abraham Stanyan	Member of Parliament for Buckingham; 1717–1722; With: Alexander Denton	Succeeded by Alexander Denton; Richard Grenville
Preceded by John Lade; Fisher Tench	Member of Parliament for Southwark; 1722–1729; With: George Meggott 1722-1724; John Lade 1724-1727; Sir Joseph Eyles 1727-1729	Succeeded by Sir Joseph Eyles; Thomas Inwen
