= Sir John Lade, 1st Baronet (1st creation) =

English brewer and politician

Sir John Lade, 1st Baronet (1662–1740) was an English brewer and politician who sat in the House of Commons between 1713 and 1727.

== Early life ==
Lade was the fifth but third surviving son of Thomas Lade of Warbleton and his wife Mary Nutt, daughter of John Nutt, DD, of Selmeston, Sussex and was baptized on. 29 May 1662. He became a brewer at Southwark and a member of the Leathersellers Company. He built up a fortune from brewing and invested widely in overseas trading enterprises.

== Career ==
Politically Lade was to start with a strong Jacobite and become involved in local politics on the Tory side as early as 1695. There was a powerful contingent of Whig brewers at Southwark, in particular Charles Cox, and Lade decided to challenge them. He stood at the general election at Southwark in July 1702. Although defeated, he petitioned and the election was declared void. However he did not fare any better in the rerun of the election in November 1702. He did not stand at the 1705 general election, but Charles Cox and his fellow Whigs launched a campaign to discredit him before the 1708 general election. In March 1709 he suggested to Henry Sacheverell that he put himself forward for the vacant office of chaplain at St Saviour's, Southwark and after launching a vigorous campaign, Sacheverell was successful. Lade went to St. Paul's to hear Sacheverell deliver a controversial sermon for which he was later impeached. The campaign at Southwark and the sermon antagonized the Whigs and stirred up Tory support which lead them to victory at the 1710 general election. Lade did not share the triumph as he was defeated at Southwark again. In 1710 he became Master of the Leathersellers’ Company for a year and in 1711 he was appointed a Commissioner for. taking subscriptions to the South Sea Company. He was an assistant of the. Royal African Company in 1712 and 1713. At the 1713 general election he was elected Member of Parliament for Souhthwark. The election was declared void in April 1714 but he topped the poll in a re-election on 3 May 1714.

Lade was returned unopposed as MP for Southwark at the 1715 general election. By 1719 he was a Governor of St Thomas’ Hospital. and was a director of the South Sea Company from 1721 to 1724. He did not stand at Southwark in 1722 but was returned at a by-election on 17 January 1724. He did not stand at the 1727 general election. In 1728 he was Master of the Leathersellers’ Company again for a year. He was created baronet on. 11 March 1731. From 1733 to 1739, he was a director of the South Sea Company again.

== Death and legacy ==
Lade died unmarried on 30 July 1740. He was succeeded in the baronetcy according to remainder by his great nephew, John Whithorne, who took the name of Lade.

Parliament of Great Britain
Preceded by Sir Charles Cox; Sir George Matthews	Member of Parliament for Southwark; 1713– 1722; With: Fisher Tench	Succeeded by George Meggott; Edmund Halsey
Preceded by George Meggott; Edmund Halsey	Member of Parliament for Southwark; 1724–1727; With: Edmund Halsey	Succeeded by Sir Joseph Eyles; Edmund Halsey
Baronetage of Great Britain
New creation	Baronet (of Warbleton); 1731-1740	Succeeded by John Lade
