= Charles Cox (brewer) =

English brewer and Whig Member of Parliament

Sir Charles Cox (1660–1729) was an English brewer and Whig Member of Parliament for Southwark from 1695 to 1712. For many years afterwards the MP for Southwark would generally be a brewer.

In 1709 he began to offer German Protestant refugees from the Palatinate ("Palatines") living space in his warehouses. Soon there were nearly fourteen hundred, and the residents of Southwark gave a petition to Parliament to have them removed.

When the Duke of Marlborough returned to the United Kingdom shortly after the death of Queen Anne in 1714, Sir Charles led the procession into London on 16 August [O.S. 5 August] 1714, earning him a place in a satire by Ned Ward. Not long afterwards a fire in his warehouses lost him thousands of pounds. He was appointed High Sheriff of Surrey for 1717–18. He was ruined in the South Sea Bubble of 1720.

In 1734 the case of Lady Cox was heard and it was put on record that he had been a bigamist.

Parliament of England
Preceded by John Arnold; Anthony Bowyer	Member of Parliament for Southwark; 1695–1707; With: Anthony Bowyer; John Cholmley	Succeeded by Parliament of Great Britain
Parliament of Great Britain
Preceded by Parliament of England	Member of Parliament for Southwark; 1707–1712; With: John Cholmley; Edmund Halsey; Sir George Matthews	Succeeded by John Lade; Fisher Tench
