= William Leman Rede =

Actor and playwright (1802–1847)

William Leman Rede (31 January 1802 – 3 April 1847), often referred to as simply Leman Rede, was one of the many prolific and successful playwrights who composed farces, melodramas, burlettas (light musical and comedies) and travesties, primarily for theatres such as the Olympic, Strand, and Adelphi, in the early nineteenth century. He proudly proclaimed himself a follower of Thomas Frognall Dibdin, W. T. Moncrieff, James Robinson Planché, Douglas William Jerrold and John Baldwin Buckstone—writers who established the "minor drama". This term referred to plays that were produced at venues other than Covent Garden, Drury Lane and the Haymarket, the "patent theatres" that had a legal monopoly on the presentation of serious, non-musical productions. The minor dramas did so well, however, that the patent theatres soon augmented their own bills with the same type of fare.

== Family ==
Rede's father, Leman Thomas Rede, was a barrister and member of the Inner Temple. He was also a newspaper writer, and the author of several works, including Studies of Nature (1797), an abridged translation of Jacques-Henri Bernardin de Saint-Pierre's three-volume Études de la nature (1784–1788) and Anecdotes and Biography (1799), and the compiler of the 1789 edition of the Bibliotheca Americana. Plagued with debts, Leman Thomas Rede moved his family from London to Hamburg, Germany. William Leman Rede was born there on 31 January 1802. After his father's death in 1810, his mother (d. 29 September 1835) moved back to London with her five children, including the future novelist Mary Leman Rede. Rede briefly considered a career as a boxer and held an office job with a solicitor but was soon drawn, like his elder brother Leman Thomas Tertius Rede, to acting. He excelled in light comedy roles and frequently played with the eminent actor Edmund Kean. In 1821 he married a teenager, Frances Lucy Mellor; they had three children, all of whom died young. His first play, Sixteen String Jack, a fictionalised account of the famous highwayman of that name, premièred at the Royal Coburg Theatre on 18 February 1823. After bearing three children Frances Rede died in 1824 and after her death Rede became a travelling player, acting in barns, inns and impromptu venues. Rede married Sarah Cooke, an actress, in 1830 or 1832.

Rede was prolific though not disciplined in his approach to writing, and at various times produced song lyrics, novels, magazine articles, reference works and plays. He sometimes worked with his elder brother, Leman Thomas Tertius Rede; the two were known in theatrical circles as "the inseparables". He was often short of money but was remembered as sociable, witty and always ready to contribute his time towards a 'benefit' for a fellow actor. Habitually an early riser, fit and a 'plain liver', he died unexpectedly of apoplexy at home on 3 April 1847, leaving a widow and son. He was buried in Clerkenwell cemetery in the same grave as his brother, who had died in 1832.

== Works ==
=== Plays ===
- Sixteen-String Jack (1823)
- Professionals Puzzled, or, Struggles at Starting (1832)
- The Rake's Progress(1832)
- The Old Stager and the New (1835) written as a vehicle for comedian John Liston to introduce the new recruit Charles James Mathews; the former was shown as a traditional kind of coachman and the latter as his son.
- The Skeleton Witness: Or, the Murder at the Mound (1835); plot summary here.
- Flight to New York (1836), written as a vehicle for Thomas D. Rice and incorporating his 'Jim Crow' persona.
- Life's a Lottery (1842)
- Our Village (1843)
- The Old House of West Street (1844) (Withdrawn from the licensing process on advice from the lord chamberlain's examiner of plays because of its excessive violence.)
- The Boyhood of Bacchus (1845), probably Rede's last play.

His most successful play, The Rake's Progress(1832), which later opened at the New York City Theatre on 23 January 1833, is based on William Hogarth's A Rake's Progress (1735), a cautionary series of eight prints depicting Tom Rakewell, a middle-class aspirant to aristocratic status who inherits a fortune from his miserly father, seduces and impregnates his maid, indulges in debauchery, is arrested, marries an unattractive but wealthy older woman, gambles away her fortune, goes to debtors' prison, and ends up in a madhouse. Catering to popular tastes, Rede converted the ugliness of Hogarth's world to light comedy, modernized the story, added songs, and included episodes of sentimentality; he admits in the preface to the published version (1833) that "I knew that to realize Hogarth's pictures was an impossibility." The Rake's Progress was his first drama to be printed, although allegedly nothing of the production was written down until it was revised for publication by John Duncombe.

=== Novels ===
The Wedded Wanderer, or, The Soldier's Fate (1827)

The Royal Rake, and the Adventures of Alfred Chesterton (privately printed, 1842, and serialized in the Sunday Times, 1846): a satire on George IV.
