= Wilmot baronets of Chaddesden (1759) =

Escutcheon of the Wilmot baronets of Chaddesden

The Wilmot baronetcy, of Chaddesden in the County of Derby, was created in the Baronetage of Great Britain on 15 February 1759 for Edward Wilmot, Physician to the Army and Physician-in-Ordinary to King George II and King George III.

The 3rd and 4th Baronets served as High Sheriff of Derbyshire, in 1803 and 1852 respectively. The 5th Baronet represented Derbyshire in the House of Commons from 1869 to 1885.

== Wilmot baronets, of Chaddesden (1759) ==
- Sir Edward Wilmot, 1st Baronet (1693–1786)
- Sir Robert Mead Wilmot, 2nd Baronet (1731–1793)
- Sir Robert Wilmot, 3rd Baronet (1765–1842)
- Sir Henry Sacheverell Wilmot, 4th Baronet (1801–1872)
- Sir Henry Wilmot, 5th Baronet (1831–1901)
- Sir Ralph Henry Sacheverell Wilmot, 6th Baronet (1875–1918)
- Sir Arthur Ralph Wilmot, 7th Baronet (1909–1942)
- Sir Robert Arthur Wilmot, 8th Baronet (1939–1974)
- Sir Henry Robert Wilmot, 9th Baronet (born 1967)

The heir apparent is the present holder's son Oliver Charles Wilmot (born 1999).

== Notes ==
Baronetage of Great Britain
Preceded by Lade baronets	Wilmot baronets of Chaddesden; 15 February 1759	Succeeded by Cunliffe baronets
