= Sir Fisher Tench, 1st Baronet =

Sir Fisher Tench, 1st Baronet (c.1673 – 31 October 1736) was a City of London financier, who was a Member of Parliament and a director of several companies.

== Background ==
Fisher Tench was the son of Nathaniel Tench (died 1710) and his wife Ann (died 1696), daughter and heir of William Fisher, Esq. Alderman of London. Nathaniel Tench bought the Great House estate at Leyton about 1686. The original house was probably Essex Hall, formerly Walnut Tree House, the oldest surviving building in Leyton in 1968. Nathaniel was one of the first directors of the Bank of England, and its Governor from 1699 to 1701. Nathaniel had previously been an Eastland and East India merchant. Fisher was educated at the Inner Temple and Sidney Sussex College, Cambridge.

== The Great House at Leyton ==
Nathaniel passed property at Leyton (comprising a capital message and 29 acres) to Fisher Tench and his wife Elizabeth in 1697. He inherited the rest of his father's estate in 1710, and probably soon after began to build the Great House at Leyton. It was a large mansion of two storeys, basement, and attics, built in the 'Wren' style of the period. The walls were of dark red brick with dressings of lighter brickwork and stone. The entrance front faced the high road and consisted of a central block flanked by lower and slightly recessed side wings. The main block had full-height Corinthian pilasters and a central pediment, while the wings had rusticated stone quoins. The whole façade, of thirteen bays, was surmounted by a modillion cornice, a panelled parapet, and hipped roofs with dormer-windows; six large stone vases broke the line of the parapet. The garden front was of similar size and character. The cupola from the house (demolished in 1905) is now on the tower of St. Mary's church.

== Parliament ==
Fisher Tench first sought to enter Parliament at Shaftesbury in 1708, when he was referred to as an East India merchant. He served a year as High Sheriff of Essex in 1711 and then became a Whig Member of Parliament for Southwark in 1713, when he and his fellow Whig candidate wore wool in their hats to signify their support of cloth manufacturers, in opposition to the concessions made by the Tory government in the commercial clauses of the Treaty of Utrecht (which were never ratified). The election was declared void in 1714, but both he and his fellow member were re-elected. He remained an MP until 1722, and was created a Baronet in 1715. His initial election was declared void in 1714, but he and his fellow member John Lade were both re-elected at the subsequent by-election, a keenly fought (and probably expensive) contest, but he was re-elected unopposed in 1715. He withdrew from politics after he defeat at the election of 1722.

He served as High Sheriff of Essex in 1711.

== Commercial activities ==
=== Company director ===
Fisher Tench became an Assistant of the Royal Africa Company in 1711 and its sub-Governor in 1716. This may have assisted his election to Parliament, as John Lade shared his interest. he also enjoyed the interest of Lord Cowper, one of whose protégés he had assisted in that trade. He was a director of the South Sea Company from 1715 to 1718. Later in life, he was at times a director of the Company of Mineral and Battery Works, but sometimes in conflict with Sir John Meres, its governor.

=== Lighting London ===
In 1716, with Sir Samuel Garrard, he leased the convex lights of the City of London, under the London Lighting Act 1716. When he had difficulty in paying his rent in 1735, he unsuccessfully alleged that his 21-year lease was beyond the powers of the Corporation of London to grant.

=== Plantations ===
He owned a plantation in Virginia, run by slaves, whom he converted to Christianity. One of them (George Pompey) was commemorated in a memorial as a good Christian in his death after 20 years service to Sir Fisher Tench in 1735.

=== Charitable Corporation ===
He was elected to the committee (board of directors) of the Charitable Corporation in October 1725, but held office for a little over a year, and was thus not involved in the frauds on that company. However, he was present at a committee meeting when the cashier (William Tench – his second son) was directed to draw its cash out of the hands of Mr Pepys and pay it to George Robinson. He was also at earlier committee meetings, which had resolved to issue notes to circulate like bank notes. Viscount Percy, wondered whether he would be censured, having allowed his son to remain cashier during the frauds, particularly as the son's post was worth £600 per year to him despite the salary being only £150. Robinson was paying £100, evidently to hide his roguery.

== Posterity ==
Fisher Tench died in 1736, having had five sons and four daughters, but several (including his second son William) predeceased him. He was succeeded by his son Nathaniel, who died the following year. The Great House property then passed to Nathaniel's sister Jane. She married Adam Soresby (a widower). On her death in 1752, it passed to her stepson, William Soresby, who sold the property in 1758.

Parliament of Great Britain
Preceded by Sir Charles Cox; Sir George Matthews	MP for Soutwark; 1713–1722; With: John Lade	Succeeded by Edmund Halsey; George Meggott
Baronetage of Great Britain
New creation	Baronet (of Low Leyton); 1715–1735	Succeeded by Nathaniel Tench
