= John Lade =

British aristocrat (1759–1838)

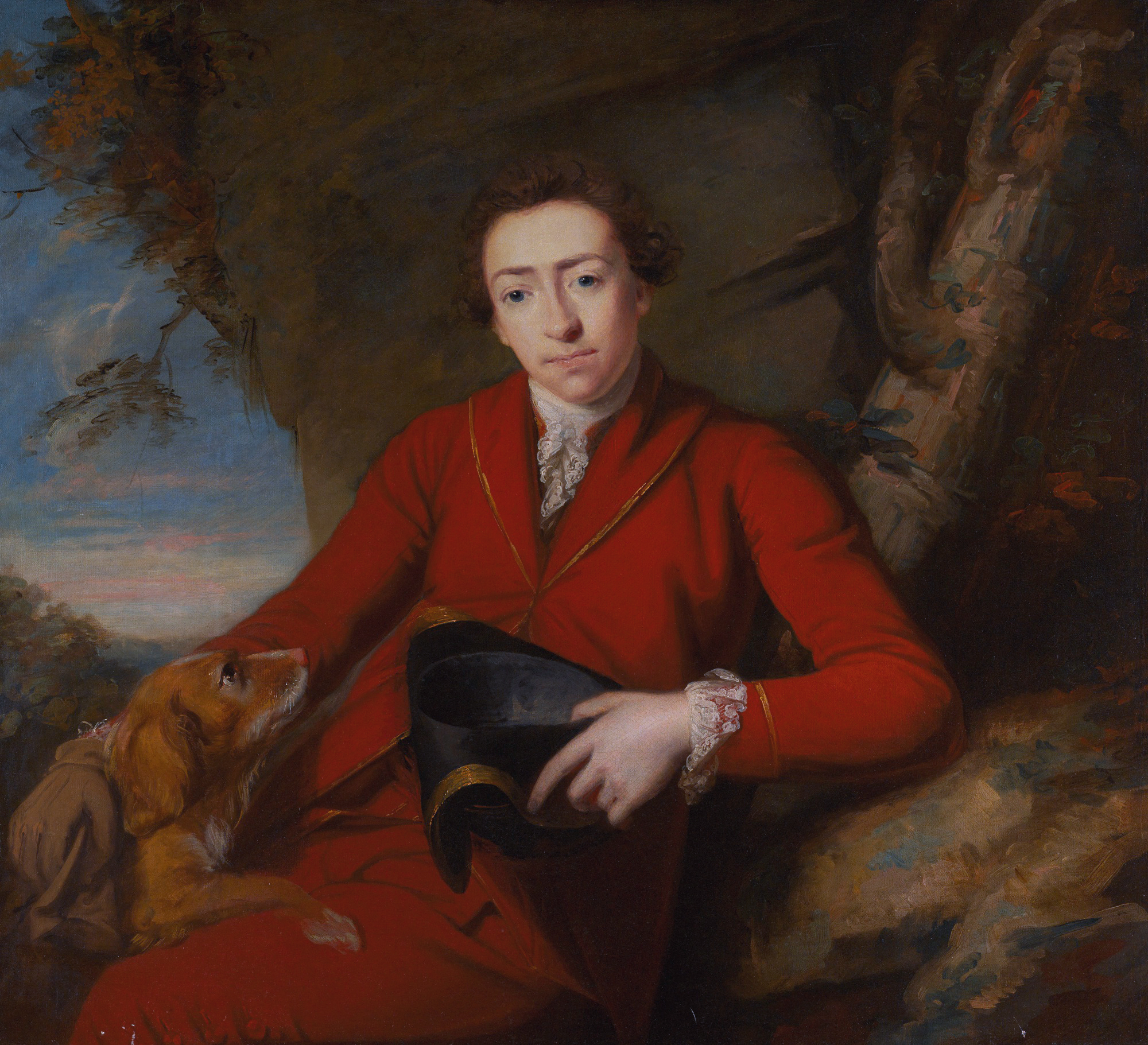
Sir John Lade, 2nd Bt. (1759–1838) with his dog (Joshua Reynolds)

Sir John Lade, 2nd Baronet (1 August 1759 – 10 February 1838) was a prominent member of Regency society, notable as an owner and breeder of racehorses, as an accomplished driver, associated with Samuel Johnson's circle, and one of George IV's closest friends. While that monarch was still Prince Regent, Lade attracted high society scorn for the extent of his debts and his choice of marriage to low-born beauty Letitia, who was generally supposed to have been the mistress of the executed highwayman John Rann and the Regent's next-youngest brother, the Duke of York.

== Early life ==
He was born the posthumous child of Sir John Lade, 1st Baronet. A maternal uncle was brewer Henry Thrale. He inherited from his father a vast fortune, also founded on brewing.

According to Abraham Hayward, Samuel Johnson was consulted on his upbringing; but Johnson had no high opinion of the boy's intellect. His original advice to Lady Lade was, "Endeavour, Madam, to procure him knowledge; for really ignorance to a rich man is like fat to a sick sheep, it only serves to call the rooks about him". As Lade grew up, Johnson grew disappointed: Hester Thrale reported that when Sir John asked Johnson for advice on whether he should marry, the reply came as:

"I would advise no man to marry, Sir," replied the Doctor in a very angry tone, "who is not likely to propagate understanding;" and so left the room.

Johnson did propose, "half in earnest", a marriage between Sir John and Fanny Burney while the boy was still a minor.

Lade matriculated at University College, Oxford in 1776. On turning 21, he received control of his fortune.

== In society ==
Lade lost money at the races and by gambling; but he developed a reputation as a judge of horseflesh. He discovered and owned Medley, a grey horse which was one of the first thoroughbreds to be imported into America, and "the most important horse of the last quarter of the eighteenth century". His "harlequin" colours were a familiar sight at races throughout the British Isles. His horse Crop was second in the 1781 Epsom Derby.

Criticised for spending so much time in the stables and at race meetings, Lade dressed in riding clothes at all times – with many capes – and carried a whip everywhere. According to the dandy Thomas Raikes, his "ambition was to imitate the groom in dress and in language". Raikes reports:

"I once heard him asking a friend on Egham racecourse to come home and dine. 'I can give you a trout spotted all over like a coach-dog, a fillet of veal as white as alablaster [sic], a pantaloon cutlet, and plenty of pancakes' – so help me! "

Nicknamed "Jehu" as a driver, Lade was a leading light, and one of the founding members, of the "Four-Horse Club", or Four in Hand Club. His slapdash style of dressing gave rise to the simple knot for which the Club is remembered. He himself famously drove a team of six greys, except when he sat up with the Prince Regent in place of the latter's coachman, driving six matched bays on the road from Brighton to London.

Lade wagered heavily on horses, and on inconsequential feats of skill; he once bet a thousand guineas against the Duke of Queensberry He once bet Lord Cholmondeley that he could carry him on his back, from opposite the Brighton Pavilion twice round the Old Steine that faced it. He "would back himself to drive the off-wheels of his phaeton over a sixpence, and once for a bet successfully took a four-in-hand round Tattersall's Yard at Hyde Park Corner". Tattersall's cramped premises were linked to Lade's social pre-eminence: the phrase he used to describe "settling-up" day at Tattersall's when debts for the quarter were paid, "Black Monday", passed into the language as a descriptor for a day when fortunes are lost.

== Letitia ==
Letitia Derby (or Smith, the sources are unclear) was a woman of uncertain origins who, prior to being discovered by the royal circle, was fairly definitely a member of the working class in the Drury Lane district, and possibly a servant in a brothel. Subsequently she befriended and was probably the mistress of "Sixteen String Jack" Rann. After that notorious highwayman was hanged in 1774, she became the mistress of the Duke of York. Soon enough, however, her looks – and her seat on a horse and skills as a driver – attracted Lade's attention and they were married, after a long affair and in spite of familial disapproval, in 1787. It is conjectured that Lade and Rann knew each other well, as Rann went to races and had once been a coachman of Hester Thrale's sister.

Letitia Lade was a great favourite with the Regent and his set; she was more than willing to join in the culture of excess that they were infamous for, and once wagered on herself in a driving contest at – scandalously – the Newmarket races; and also once bet five hundred guineas on an eight-mile race against another woman. She took after her husband in dress and demeanour, and eventually overtook him: her casual use of profanity was so "overwhelming", in fact, that it came to be acceptable to say of someone using particularly strong language that they "swear like Letty [or Lady] Lade". She is the subject of a famous equestrian portrait by Stubbs in the Royal Collection, that was commissioned by the Regent to hang in his chambers; she and Lade were also the subject of a well-known pair of portraits by Sir Joshua Reynolds that now hang in the National Gallery.

== Later years ==
Gambling, racing, women and moneylenders reduced Lade's fortune, and he spent some time in a debtor's prison. He accepted the Prince Regent's generosity, and received a pension as his "driving tutor"; to save his face, the money was made out to the name of "the Rev. Dr. Tolly".

Lade's marriage, debts and disdain for social conventions caused made him generally disreputable. Stories of snubs that the Prince Regent received on behalf of his friends centre around Lade, many of them delivered by Lord Thurlow, a friend of George III. On one occasion, when Thurlow met the Prince, Sir John, and Lord Barrymore in Brighton, the Prince asked Thurlow to come and dine with him one day; whereupon Thurlow, in the sight of all present, said "I cannot do so until your Royal Highness keeps better company". On another occasion, the words were more private but no less scathing:

The Prince of Wales in 1805 asked Lord Thurlow to dinner, and also Ladd. 'When "the old Lion" arrived the Prince went into the ante-room to meet him, and apologised for the party being larger than he had intended, but added, "that Sir John was an old friend of his, and he could not avoid asking him to dinner," to which Thurlow, in his growling voice, answered, "I have no objection, Sir, to Sir John Lade in his proper place, which I take to be your Royal Highness's coach-box, and not your table."

The Lades faded from the social scene when their money ran out, and George IV was crowned. Letitia died in 1825, and is buried at St Mary's, Staines. Lade, who lived quietly on his stud farm in Sussex, continued to receive his pension: his relative Dorothy Nevill, the writer and horticulturist, wrote of him, however, that "my poor crazy cousin" was dependent on the kindness of a court functionary and on hints dropped in suitable ears; Queen Victoria, when a young girl fresh to the throne, records in her diaries that she discovered that she was paying "a Sir John Lade, one of George IV.'s intimates".

== In literature ==
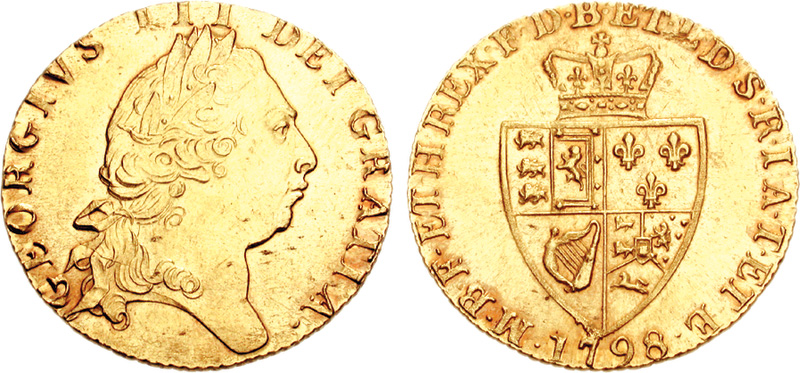
Both sides of a guinea

Lade's coming of age moved Samuel Johnson to write his poem "One-and-twenty". It began:

Long-expected one-and-twenty
Ling'ring year, at length is flown
Pride and pleasure, pomp and plenty
Great Sir John, are now your own.
Loosen'd from the minor's tether,
Free to mortgage or to sell.
Wild as wind, and light as feather
Bid the sons of thrift farewell.....
Lavish of your grandsire's guineas
Show the spirit of an heir.

The poem influenced A. E. Housman's A Shropshire Lad.

In Arthur Conan Doyle's Regency novel Rodney Stone, Sir John Lade, a leader of the "Corinthian" set of gentleman-sportsmen, serves to represent the London life the pugilist-hero immerses himself in, and is introduced by means of a race from Brighton to London. Letitia, in 1864 was a central character in George William MacArthur Reynolds's Mysteries of the Court of London. She is also a minor character in several of the Regency novels of Georgette Heyer.

Baronetage of Great Britain
Preceded by John Lade	Baronet (of Warbleton); 1759–1838	Extinct
