= Laystall =

Holding area for cattle going to market

A laystall was a place where cattle going to market could be held, and by extension became a term for a place where detritus (particularly dung) was accumulated awaiting its removal.

The siting of laystalls was a contentious issue during the rebuilding of London after the fire of 1666, due to the noise and nuisance they created. Several streets in the UK bear the name Laystall Street, such as in Clerkenwell, London.

== See also ==
Whitechapel Mount
