= John Rann =

English criminal and highwayman (c. 1750 – 1774)

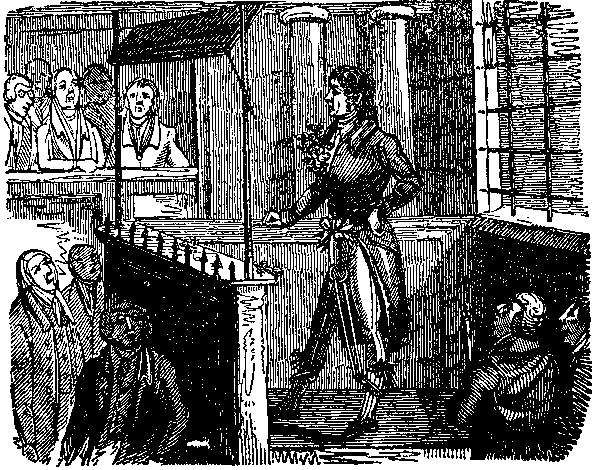
- John Rann in the dock before magistrate Fielding.
- Born: 1750; Somerset, England
- Died: 30 November 1774 (aged 23–24); Tyburn, London
- Other name: 16 String Jack
- Occupation: Criminal
- Known for: Highwayman

John Rann (c. 1750 – 30 November 1774) was an English criminal and highwayman during the mid-18th century. He was a prominent and colourful local figure renowned for his wit and charm. He came to be known as "Sixteen String Jack" after receiving silk breeches, laced with eight strings on each leg, as a gift from his employer.

== Life and crimes ==
Born near Bath in Somerset, England, he served as a postillion to a local woman and during his teenage years worked as a coachman in London. He soon became accustomed to living beyond his means, such as wearing expensive costumes in which to attend balls and galas of the city's social circles, and was constantly in debt as a result.

He began pick-pocketing with some success, eventually stealing watches and other valuables along Hounslow Road. Soon he became a highwayman and, although he was arrested several times on charges of highway robbery, six of his cases were dismissed due to lack of evidence as witnesses were unable to identify Rann.

During one trial at Bow Street, while wearing an unusually large number of flowers in his coat and his irons decorated with blue ribbons, Rann reportedly addressed the presiding magistrate Sir John Fielding, saying "I know no more of the matter than you do or half as much" when he was asked if he had anything to say in his defence.

He was finally apprehended after robbing the chaplain of Princess Amelia near Brentford in 1774 and held in custody at Newgate Gaol, where he supposedly entertained seven women at a farewell dinner before his execution on 30 November. Shortly before he was to be hanged, appearing in a specially made pea-green suit adorned with a large nosegay, he enjoyed cheerful banter with both the hangman and the crowd, then danced a jig, before being publicly executed at Tyburn at the age of 24.

An alternative (but of unsubstantiated provenance) account of John Rann's capture and given in Julius Jottings, Nr4. relates to his employ as a coachman by one William Julius, Secretary to the then Prime Minister, the Marquis of Rockingham. Julius was renowned for his well turned-out grey carriage horses, one of which was taken by Rann to hold up the Duke of Argyll at gunpoint whilst his master was attending a London theatre. The robbery was unsuccessful and Rann's pursuit by the Duke led to his identification and subsequent conviction. The Jottings were written by the Rev Dr Churchill Julius in 1901 when he was Bishop of Christchurch, in New Zealand.

== In popular culture ==
A play about Rann, Sixteen String Jack, was a first hit for playwright William Leman Rede in 1823. A novel based on his life, titled Sixteen String Jack, was published in 1841.

Sixteen String Jack features prominently in the English penny dreadful Black Bess; or, The Knight of the Road by Edward Viles (1866).

The production company for the HBO television show Last Week Tonight with John Oliver is named Sixteen String Jack Productions.

Sixteen String Jack is the headless horseman in the book Jack's Head by Siggy Shade where he is the main love interest.
