= Sir John Lade, 1st Baronet (2nd creation) =

Member of Parliament for Camelford 1754-1759

John Lade (c. 1731 – 1759), of Warbleton, Sussex, was a Member of Parliament for Camelford in 1754 – 21 April 1759.

Baronetage of Great Britain
New creation	Baronet (of Warbleton); 1758–1759	Succeeded by John Lade
