= Lade baronets =

Set index for Lade baronets

There have been two Lade baronetcies, both in the Baronetage of Great Britain. Both are extinct.

- Lade baronets of Warbleton (1st creation, 1731)
- Lade baronets of Warbleton (2nd creation, 1758)
