= George Meggott =

English politician

George Meggott (1669 – 1723), of Stoney Lane, St. Olave's, Southwark, was an English Member of Parliament (MP). He was a Member of the Parliament of Great Britain for Southwark in 1722–1723.
