= Marguerite Pelouze =

French heiress (1836–1902)

Marguerite Pelouze (née Wilson; 24 May 1836 - 25 July 1902) was an heiress, daughter of Scottish industrialist Daniel Wilson, sister-in-law to French chemist Théophile-Jules Pelouze and sister of French deputy Daniel Wilson. From 1864 to 1888, she owned the château de Chenonceau, making it an academy of arts and letters that hosted writers, historians, musicians, painters and sculptors.

== Life ==
=== Early life ===
She was born in Paris into a very rich family living in the city's 2nd old arrondissement. She was the eldest daughter of Scottish chemist and industrialist Daniel Wilson and his French wife Antoinette Henriette Casenave. Her mother died in 1843, her sister Marie-Anne Berthe in 1845 and her father in 1849. A family lawyer made Casenave's brother Antoine Mathieu Casenave, vice-president of the tribunal de Première Instance de Paris, the two children's tutor on 5 September 1849. He held that role until 1857 for Marguerite and until 1861 for Daniel junior. From 1857 onwards Marguerite took over her brother's education, teaching him about social life and introducing him to artists, politicians and businessmen.

== Bibliography ==
In French unless otherwise noted.

- Michel Cotte, « Le rôle des ouvriers et entrepreneurs britanniques dans le décollage industriel français des années 1820 », Documents pour l'histoire des techniques, Marseille, no 19, 2e semestre 2010, p. 119 - 130 (ISSN 1775-4194, lire en
- (in English) 'Daniel Wilson', in Alec W. Skempton, A Biographical Dictionary of Civil Engineers in Great Britain and Ireland, vol. 1 : 1500 to 1830, London, Éditions Thomas Telford on behalf of the Institution of Civil Engineers, 28 February 2002, 897 p. (ISBN 978-0-7277-2939-2), pages 786–787
- Mollier, Jean-Yves (2 May 1991). Le scandale de Panama. Paris: Éditions Librairie Arthème Fayard. ISBN 978-2-21302-674-9.
- Richard, Charles (1887). Chenonceaux et Gustave Flaubert. Tours: Éditions Deslis frères.
- Chevalier, Casimir (May 1879). Histoire abrégée de Chenonceau. Lyon: Éditions Alphonse Louis Perrin et Marinet.
- Flaubert, Gustave. Correspondance de Gustave Flaubert et d'Ivan Tourguéniev. Grandes correspondances. Paris: Éditions Flammarion. ISBN 978-2-08211-535-3. (Note: Letter of Gustave Flaubert, 18 February 1879 (page 252) : I get on very well with Mme Pelouze, friend of Grévy. According to note 4, he wanted her to use her influence on Grévy to get him the post of curator of the bibliothèque Mazarine in Paris - that role's holder, Ustazade Silvestre de Sacy (1801-1879), was then seriously ill. However, Léon Gambetta appointed Frédéric Baudry.)
