= Daniel Wilson (chemist) =

Scottish French chemist and industrialist (1790–1849)

Daniel Wilson (1790 - 2 September 1849), was a Scottish chemist and engineer who became a wealthy industrialist in 19th-century France through his co-ownership of that supplied gas lighting to Paris. He owned one of the largest private art collections in France and married into French aristocracy, leading to line of French Wilson's some of whom who also became notable in French society.

== Biography ==
Born in Glasgow in 1970, he left Scotland after his chemistry studies for Dublin, but then went to London in 1817 to the home of Aaron Manby (1776–1850), also an engineer, who headed the Horseley steel factory. Manby supplied the Gas Light and Coke Company, and Wilson acted as his agent.

In 1819, Wilson and Manby moved their attention to France under the restored Bourbon monarchy to supply the emerging new French gas industry. The two men became business associates and in 1822 they set up the "Forges de Charenton" (the Charenton Iornworks), and in 1826 bought the "Forges du Creusot" (the Creusot Iornworks). Both companies would become bankrupt in 1833 after the chaos of the 1830 July Revolution.

They would overcome these financial setbacks, and another business that Manby and Wilson established in 1821, along with a French associate Jean Henry, called the "Compagnie d'éclairage par le gaz hydrogène" (more commonly known as the "Compagnie Anglaise"), would become one of the most successful of all the early Parisian gas companies. They developed patents for the use of gas in lighting. By 1825, the company had built a gasworks in the Ternes district in Paris, and in 1829 the company provided the gas to illuminate the Rue de la Paix. The venture would make Wilson very wealthy, and it survived as an independent operation until 1847 when all the Paris gas companies were merged into a single entity.

On 25 June 1835 in Paris, Wilson married Antoinette Henriette Casenave, daughter of French politician, Antoine Casenave. Casenave was from a family of magistrates and parliamentarians. The couple lived in the old 2nd arrondissement of Paris and had three children, Marguerite (born on 24 May 1836), Marie-Anne Berthe (born on 23 July 1838), and Daniel junior (born on 6 March 1840). Casenave died in Paris on 5 August 1843, followed by her second child Marie-Anne on 21 February 1845 in Paris. Daniel died in his Château d'Écoublay in Fontenay-Trésigny on 2 September 1849.

Wilson was a member of the Institution of Civil Engineers in London, and his obituary in the minutes of the instutution's proceedings in 1850 read:

He was an example of the success that can be achieved by a steady adherance to a defined course; for, although all his early efforts proved singularly unfortunate, and during his whole career he never acquired more than a superficial knowledge of mathematics, mechanics, or chemistry, yet, by extreme caution, and the aid of a retentitive memory, he was enabled to attain a good position in the Parisian scientific world.

— Minutes of the Proceedings of the Institution of Civil Engineers, Volume 9, London 1850.

== Bibliography ==
- Palmer, Michael B. (November 2020). The Daniel Wilsons in France, 1819–1919: Industry, the Arts, the Press, Châteaux, the Elysée Palace, and Scandal. Routledge. ISBN 9780367629199.
