= Vulcan (barge) =

The Vulcan, launched in 1819, was the first all iron-hulled vessel (boat) to be built. It was designed as a horse-drawn passenger barge for use on the Scottish canals.

== History ==
In 1816, the Forth and Clyde Canal Company, which had earlier successfully adapted new technology to shipbuilding with the Charlotte Dundas, authorised the development of an all-iron ship, and they quickly settled upon building a canal barge. In 1818, Thomas Wilson (1781–1873), was hired as the shipwright. The barge was to be 20 metres (66.5 ft.) long and narrow enough for the canal. The design called for iron sectionals to be riveted together with covering plates. Two blacksmiths were hired to construct the parts.

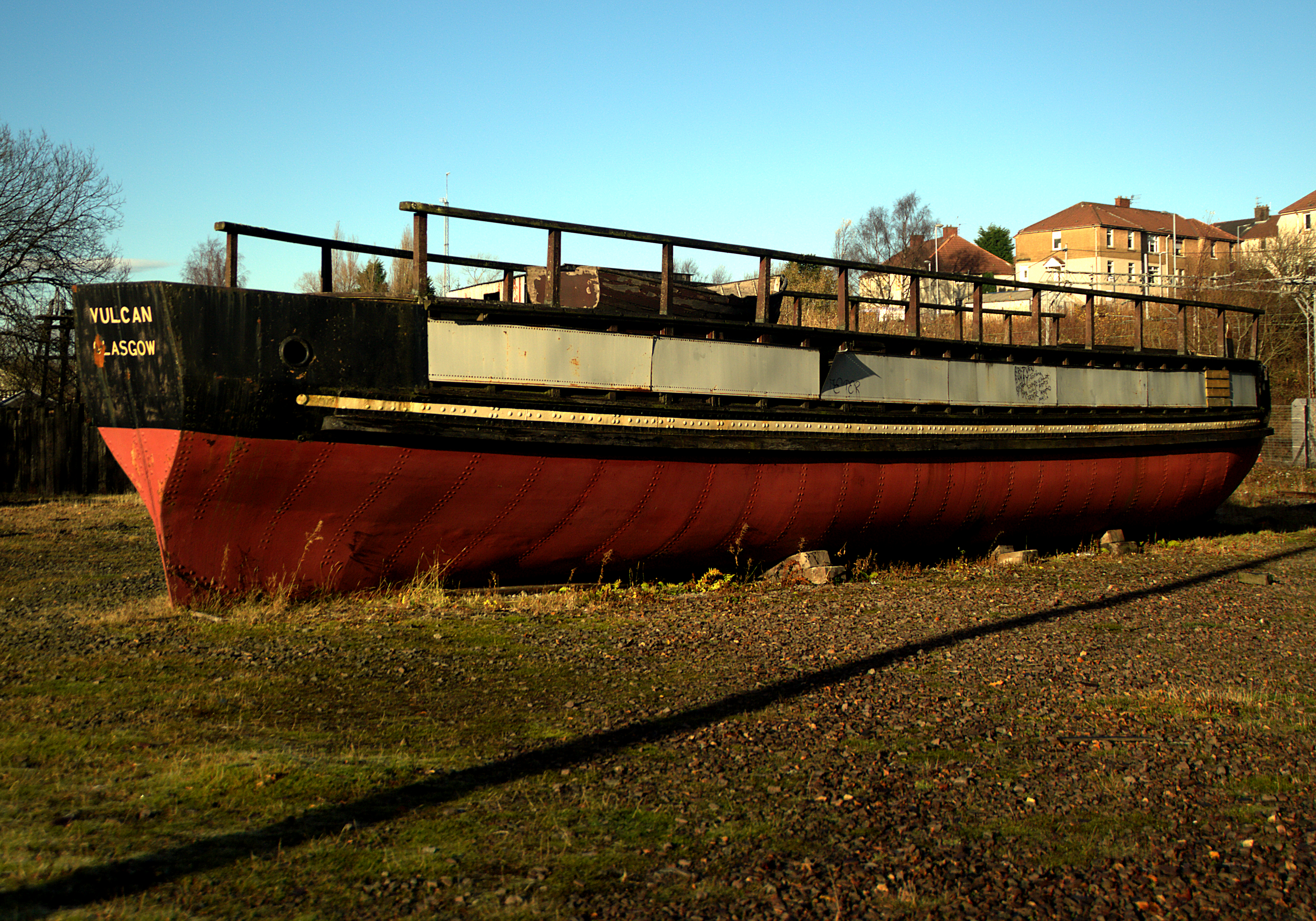
Replica of Vulcan

The plating had to be hammered out of puddled iron as no iron rolling mills existed at the time. The iron was supplied by the Monklands Steel Company.

The Vulcan was built outside Glasgow, in Faskine, Airdrie, on the bank of the Monkland Canal.

The Vulcan was launched in May 1819 and carried passengers between Edinburgh and Glasgow. Later it was converted to a cargo handler and was sold for scrap in 1873. In 1988, a replica of the Vulcan was constructed in Glasgow, and now resides at the Summerlee Museum of Scottish Industrial Life.

== See also ==
- Aaron Manby, first steamship made of iron, maiden voyage May 1821.
- Charlotte Dundas, first commercial steam propelled vessel, maiden voyage 1802.

== Sources ==
- Dear, I. C. B. and Kemp, Peter (eds.) (2006) "Vulcan" The Oxford Companion to Ships and the Sea (2nd ed.) Oxford University Press, Oxford, England, ISBN 978-0-19-920568-4
