= Charles Manby =

English engineer (1804–1884)

Charles Manby FRS FRSA
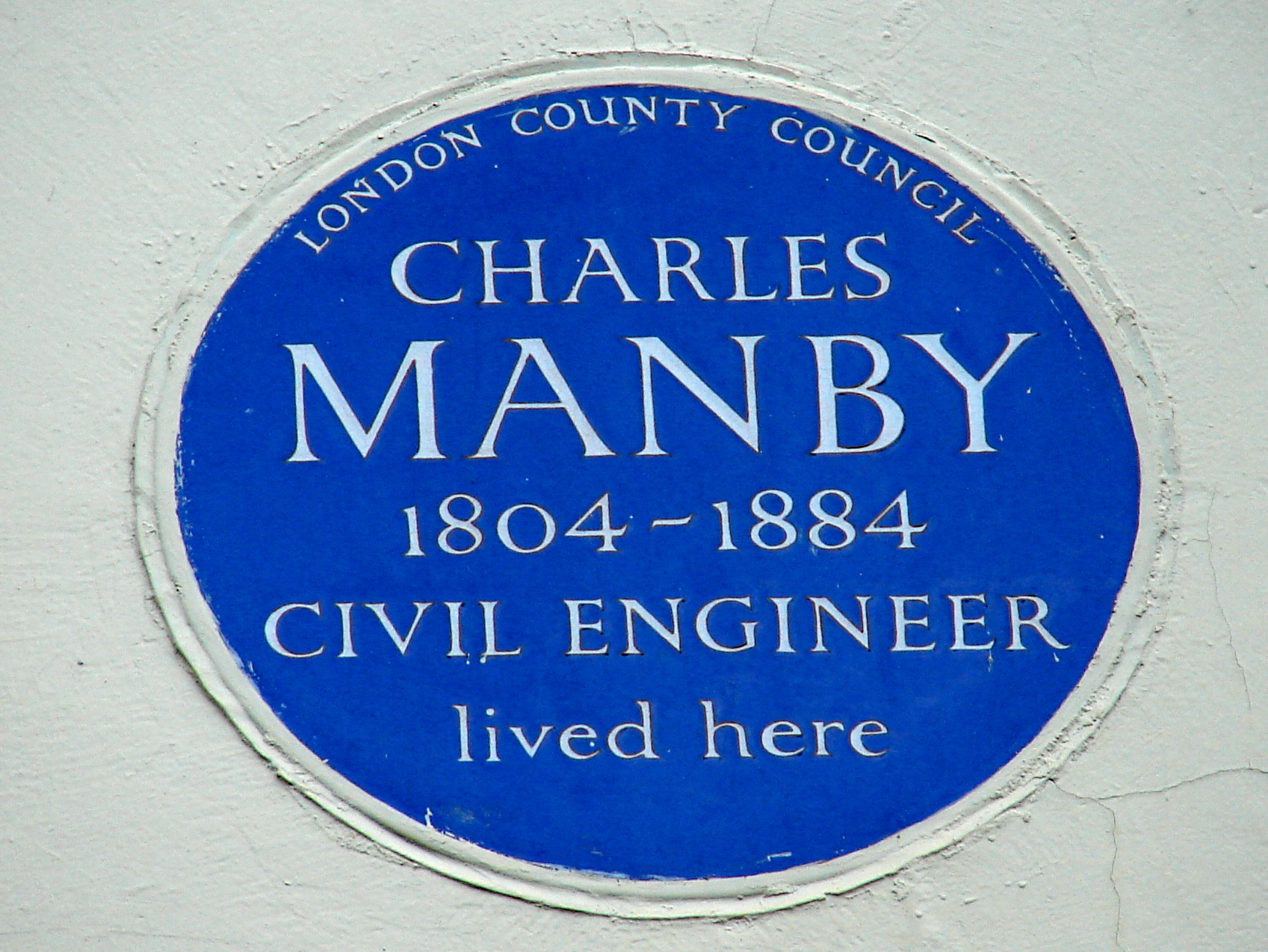
- Blue plaque commemorating Manby
- Born: 4 February 1804; Cowes, Isle of Wight
- Died: 31 July 1884 (aged 80); London, England
- Occupation: Civil Engineer
- Known for: Secretary of the Institution of Civil Engineers
- Partners: Ellen Jones; Harriet Willard
- Parents: Aaron Manby; Juliana Manby

Charles Manby (4 February 1804 – 31 July 1884) was Secretary of the Institution of Civil Engineers from November 1839 to 1856, and engineer of the first iron steamer to cross the English Channel. Fluent in French, he installed gas piping into Paris and advised on the construction of the Suez Canal.

== Personal life ==
Manby was born in Cowes on the Isle of Wight to Aaron and Juliana Manby, née Fewster. Aaron Manby was a successful engineer building bridges, ships and engines. As a child Charles attended a Roman Catholic seminary; in 1814 he attended well disciplined Saint-Servan College near Rennes, but returned to England in 1815 having turned down the opportunity of joining the military under a commission organised by his uncle.

== Engineering career ==
Manby's father was the founder, and from 1812, the managing partner of the Horseley Ironworks at Tipton, Staffordshire. In 1817, Charles began training as an engineer at the Ironworks working for such notable engineers as John Rennie and Thomas Telford. During his training he helped with projects at West India Docks and the iron paddleship which was named Aaron Manby. This was made in parts at the Ironworks and then transported to the Surrey Canal Dock on the River Thames in London. The ship was then reassembled with Charles Manby supervising the installation of the vessel's steam engine. Despite being only 18 years old, Manby was designated as the chief engineer during its maiden voyage on 10 June 1822 with Sir Charles Napier as captain. During this voyage across the English Channel, the vessel became the first iron ship to carry cargo from London to Paris.

In 1823 Manby started work installing hydrogen gas pipes in Paris, employed by the French company Compagnie d'Carriage par de gaz Hydrogen; The company had been founded by Daniel Wilson and Manby's father the year before. Still employed in France by his father, Manby worked at a gas works at Ternes, then later reorganised the ironworks at Le Creusot. Manby's fluency in the French language was an asset throughout his life. Manby was then employed by the French government creating France's state-owned tobacco factories.

Charles then returned to the UK and took over the management of the Beaufort Iron Works in Beaufort, Blaenau Gwent where he married Ellen Jones in 1830.

He briefly managed the Bristol Iron Works, but in 1834 he moved to London and began practising there as a civil engineer. He and Henry Cruger Price marketed the 'Price and Manby System' a new type of ventilation system for whole buildings. The business lasted until 1843 when their offices in Bristol and London closed. Manby had become involved with the Arctic explorer Sir John Ross's India Steamship Company which he joined in 1838. The company's objective was to establish a steamship service to India, but it was quickly taken over by the Peninsular and Oriental Steam Navigation Company.

Charles Manby then became Secretary of the Institution of Civil Engineers (ICE) in November 1839, succeeding Thomas Webster. He nominally retired from this role in 1856 and was awarded a testimonial, a prize and a purse of 2,000 pounds from the chairman Robert Stephenson. The next secretary was Manby's former assistant James Forrest. Manby remained involved in the organisation and participated in its activities as Honorary Secretary until his death.

Manby helped Samuel Colt's company to create a factory in Pimlico to manufacture firearms. Colt had received a lot of interest in his revolvers at the Great Exhibition in 1851 and Manby had been involved in the organisation of the exhibition arranging financial underwriting for Sir Robert Peel. Manby negotiated a lease with the British Government which enabled Colt to go into full production three years later. Colt was able to make a profit during the Crimean War, but the factory closed in 1856 shortly after the end of the war.

In 1853 Manby became a Fellow of the Royal Society and in 1856 he became the London representative of locomotive manufacturer Robert Stephenson and Company. Manby moved next door to Stephenson and travelled across Europe to represent the locomotive company using the contacts which he had created during his 17 years as secretary of the ICE.

Charles Manby was chosen with James Rendel and John Robinson McClean to join the International Scientific Commission on the Suez Canal. This was based in Paris where his French language was again useful. His knowledge of engineering and his linguistic skills helped him serve as one of the secretaries to the International Commission for the piercing of the isthmus of Suez, with Jules Barthélemy-Saint-Hilaire and Lieutenant Lieussou.

In 1858, Manby, by now a childless widower, married Harriet Willard, the widow of publisher W. U. Hood. This second marriage also had no issue. He died on 31 July 1884, at Ranelagh House, 10 Lower Grosvenor Place, London.

== Legacy ==
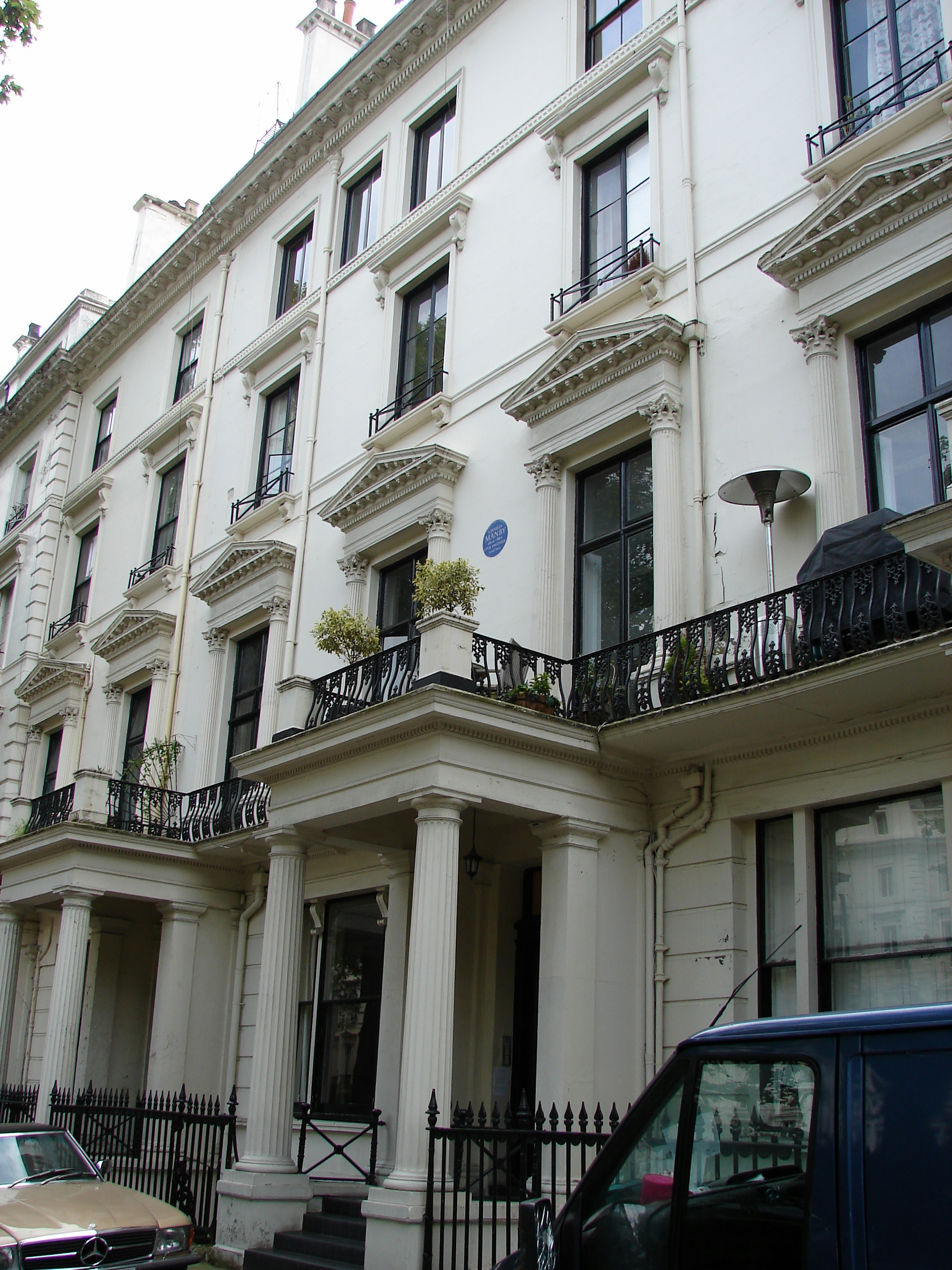
Charles Manby's house with blue plaque

In 1860, Manby helped create the Engineer & Railway Volunteer Staff Corps (today, the British Army Reserve's Engineer and Logistic Staff Corps. As a result, Manby became a lieutenant-colonel.

Manby left an estate of just under £250. Today his home at 60 Westbourne Terrace in London is identified by a blue plaque.

In addition to British honours he received acknowledgement being made Honorary Member for his work by the Institute of Civil Engineers in the Netherlands, an officer of the French Legion of Honour and an Italian knight of the Order of Saints Maurice and Lazarus and with similar honours from Turkey, Brazil and Sweden.
