= Engineer and Logistic Staff Corps =

Volunteer advisory unit of the British Army

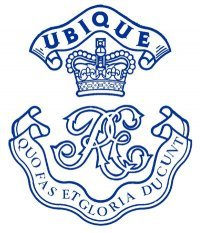
Royal Engineer Cypher as used by the Engineer and Logistic Staff Corps

The Engineer and Logistic Staff Corps is a part of the Royal Engineers in the British Army Reserve. It is intended to provide advisers on engineering and logistics to the British Army at a senior level. Following its work creating the NHS Nightingale Hospitals the Corps was described as 'probably the greatest military unit you've never heard of'.

== History ==
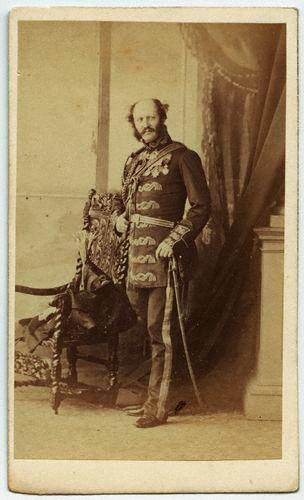
Sir William McMurdo, Honorary Colonel of the Corps from 1865–1894

In 1859 there was considerable public interest in the creation of a Volunteer Force to assist the British Army, and the creation of volunteer corps were authorised in War Office circulars that year. In response, a "Volunteer Engineering Staff Corps for the Arrangement of Transport of Troops and Stores, the Construction of defensive works and the destruction of other works in case of Invasion" was proposed in 1860 by Charles Manby, then honorary secretary of the Institution of Civil Engineers (ICE). He submitted his scheme to the War Office through the Marquess of Salisbury, as Lord Lieutenant of Middlesex. The then Secretary of State for War, Sidney Herbert, replied to say that he believed such a Corps would be a great advantage to the public service and that he would recommend Her Majesty to accept its formation as soon as the principal features had been agreed.

Negotiations with the numerous independent railway companies took some time but in September 1864 the Inspector General of Volunteers, Colonel William McMurdo conveyed the approval of the Secretary of State, now Earl de Grey and Ripon, and went on to set out the objects and duties the Secretary of State would require of the Corps. On 7 November Manby submitted the names of 12 civil engineers and 9 general managers who would form the nucleus of the Corps. Once the Queen had accepted the services of the Corps on 4 January 1865 the first 21 officers were commissioned on 21 January 1865.

The founding civil engineers comprised George Parker Bidder, John Hawkshaw, John Robinson McClean, John Fowler, Charles Hutton Gregory, Joseph Cubitt, Thomas Elliot Harrison, George Willoughby Hemans, George Robert Stephenson, Charles Blacker Vignoles, William Henry Barlow, Charles Manby and the general managers included James Joseph Allport.

Bidder, a former ICE President, was designated Lieutenant Colonel Commandant, a post he would hold until 1878, Manby was Acting Adjutant (until 1884) and a week later McMurdo became Honorary Colonel (until 1894) - he presided over the initial Council meeting in April.

The objective of the Engineer and Railway Staff Corps was to ensure "the combined action among all the railways when the country is in danger" and tasked particularly with "the preparation, during peace, of schemes for drawing troops from given distant parts and for concentrating them within given areas in the shortest possible time". The original establishment of 21 officers was expanded to 110 in 1908 before being subsequently reduced to a strength of 60 officers. The unit was always a volunteer unit, with members retaining their civilian jobs. Until its reorganisation in 1943 its members were entitled to wear a uniform similar to that of the Royal Engineers.

In recent times recruitment has diversified from road, rail and port specialists to cover almost all aspects of engineering. It also began to advise the Royal Corps of Transport (in addition to the Royal Engineers) and was renamed the Engineer and Transport Staff Corps in 1984 to reflect this. Following the creation of the Royal Logistic Corps in 1993 the unit was renamed again to the Engineer and Logistic Staff Corps. Until 2015 the unit was organisationally part of HQ Engineer in Chief (Army), constituted under the Reserve Forces Act 1996 and administered by the Ministry of Defence.

In 2015 the Staff Corps marked its 150th anniversary and celebratory events included a dinner at One Great George Street on 26 November at which the guest of honour was HRH Princess Anne, The Princess Royal.

== Current work ==
In 2015 the Engineer and Logistic Staff Corps, together with the General Service Corps, were incorporated into the 77th Brigade. Both the Staff Corps and the General Service Corps have been expanded and now provide body of board level leaders in engineering, logistics, data & digital, finance & commerce and a cohort of senior managers in communications, advertising, marketing and academia able to advise the army.

Members of the Engineer and Logistic Staff Corps hold their commissions as officers in the Royal Engineers (Volunteers) and are grouped into six directorates: engineering, infrastructure and systems; logistics; cyber and communications; corporate support and healthcare.

The establishment strength of 120 officers, increased from 60 in 2021, consists of 25 Colonels, 50 Lieutenant Colonels and 45 Majors. Membership is by invitation only and promotion generally follows seniority with some discretion to allow for individual officers' statuses in their profession and their level of participation in the corps. Officers who cease to be engaged in a relevant profession must offer to resign their commissions but may retain their appointment on the Commanding Officer's recommendation and with the approval of the Army Board of the Defence Council. All officers of the corps are briefed to expect calls at any time to provide impartial and confidential advice to the British Armed Forces.

Officers are regularly invited to relevant army conferences and equipment demonstrations to keep them up to date with current capabilities. However, members are rarely seen in uniform and enjoy an independence not seen elsewhere in the military. "If I have to sit in front of a three-star General and explain that he or she may be wrong, I need to be able to do that without wearing a rank slide" said the Commanding Officer, Gary Sullivan, in 2020.

The corps is administered by a Board of senior corps officers, chaired by the Commander (a Colonel as Commanding Officer) and assisted by the Chief of Staff (formerly Acting Adjutant), normally a Lieutenant Colonel who also acts as the Board’s secretary. The Chief of Staff is always a retired army officer currently working in a relevant profession who acts as a point of contact for advice. The current officers are mainly chief executives, directors and senior managers of 60 different engineering, transport and logistics organisations, which together employ 100,000 people.

Recent Commanders include:

Colonel Keith White CBE 2008-2017

Colonel Richard Hunt CBE 2017-2019

Colonel Gary Sullivan OBE 2019-2023

Colonel Simon Duckworth CBE DL 2023-

Since June 2026 the Corps' current Honorary Colonel is Lt General Eldon Millar CVO MBE, the UK’s Military Representative to NATO, who succeeded Lt General Sir David Eastman KBE, Deputy Chief of the General Staff (Hon Colonel 2024-26). He is supported by a Deputy Hon Colonel, Maj General Joe Fossey OBE, both of whom are former Commanders of 8 Engineer Brigade.

== Operations ==
The corps has advised British forces in the following operations, amongst others:

- Gulf War
- Bosnian War
- Kosovo War
- Afghanistan War
- Iraq War
- The COVID-19 Pandemic, Operation RESCRIPT

In addition to peacetime roles in infrastructure, training, planning and logistics.

In April 2020 the Corps was singled out at a Downing Street briefing by the chief of the defence staff, General Sir Nick Carter, who said of the military response to the COVID-19 pandemic in the United Kingdom “in all my more than 40 years of service this is the single greatest logistic challenge that I’ve come across. It has been a whole-force effort including not just regular military from all the three services but reservists as well; some 15% of the force has been reservists. It has involved defence civilians, defence contractors, scientists from Porton Down and something called the Engineer and Logistics Staff Corps, where we bring in people from industry who work inside the military in times of crisis and provide expert support for how we might link into the civilian community to bring forward skills and indeed industrial support.”

== See also ==
- No. 601 Squadron RAF
