= Daniel Wilson (politician) =

French politician (1840–1919)

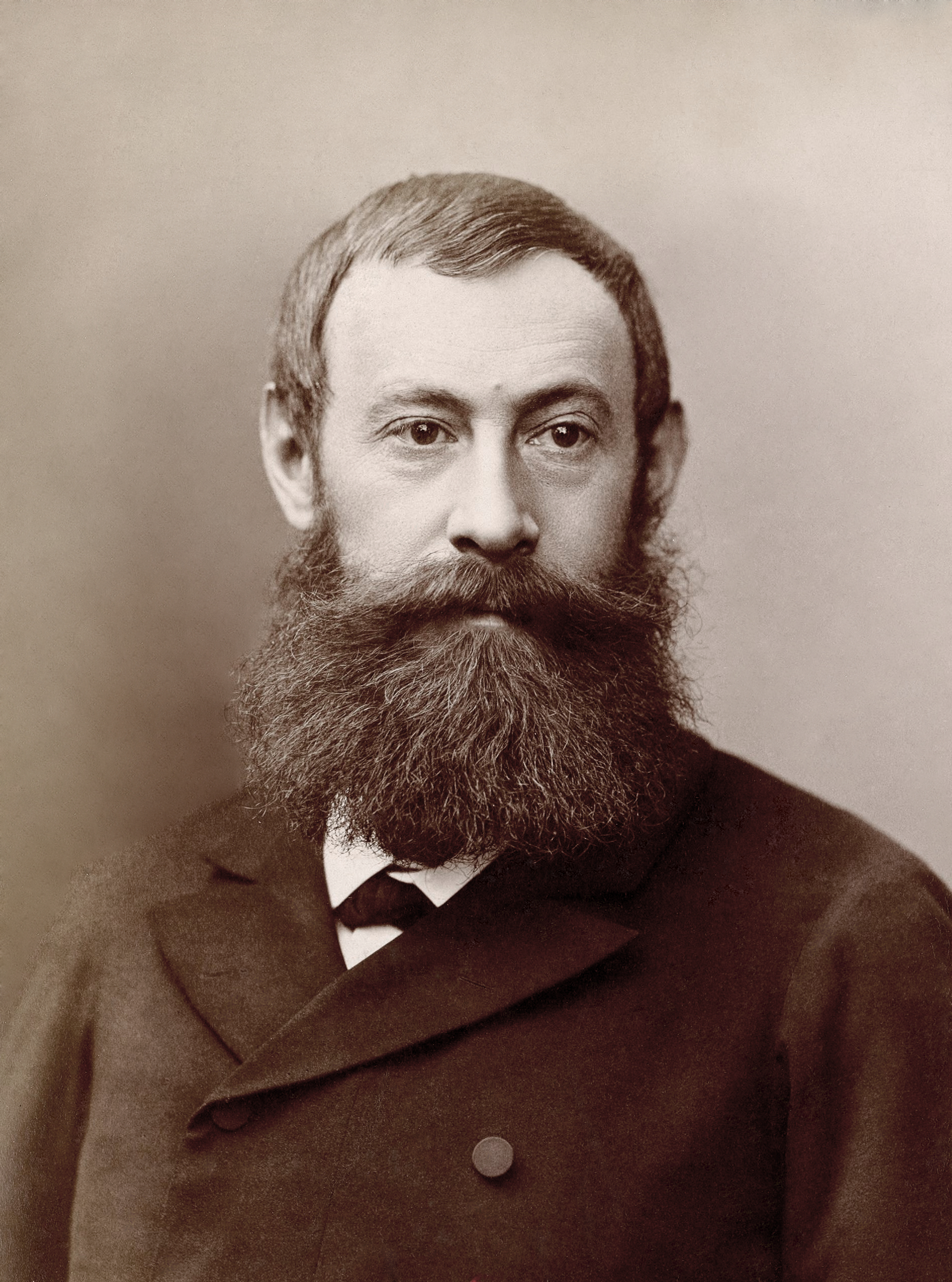
Wilson by Nadar.

Daniel Wilson (6 March 1840 - 13 February 1919) was a French politician. He remains notable for being implicated in the 1887 decorations scandal which led to the dismissal of his father-in-law, president Jules Grévy.

== Life ==
He was the son of Scottish chemist Daniel Wilson and his wife Antoinette-Henriette Casenave, making him grandson of Antoine Casenave and brother of Marguerite Wilson. He lost his parents very young and until 1861 he was under the guardianship of his mother's brother Antoine Mathieu Casenave, vice-president of the Tribunal de première instance de la Seine. In September 1861, after sharing his father's fortune with his sister Marguerite, he received 3 million francs, a hôtel particulier at 26-28 rue de Varenne in Paris, the 121 hectare Bellevue estate in Ruffec, Indre and the 312 hectare estate around château d'Écoublay, which he sold in 1879.

=== Political career ===
In Paris he lived in a vast hôtel particulier at 2 avenue d’Iéna at the corner of avenue Albert-de-Mun.

=== Marriage and issue ===
On 22 October 1881 in the chapel of the palais de l'Élysée, he married Alice, daughter of Jules Grévy (French president from 1879 to 1887). The witnesses were Jules Ferry, président du Conseil, and Pierre Magnin, Finance Minister.

They had three children:

- Marguerite-Coralie-Julie-Henriette-Marie (vicomtesse Gérard de Kergariou), died without issue ;
- Jeanne-Alice-Marie (baroness Laurent Cerise) ;
- Suzanne-Hélène (died unmarried and without issue)

== Bibliography (in French) ==
- Jean-Pierre Aubert, « Les républicains peuvent-ils se débarrasser de Daniel Wilson ? L'élection municipale de Loches de 1892 », Mémoires de l'Académie des sciences, arts et belles lettres de Touraine, t. 28, 2015, p. 87-111 (ISSN 1153-1118, lire
- "Daniel Wilson (politician)", in Adolphe Robert and Gaston Cougny, Dictionnaire des parlementaires français (1789–1891), Bourloton, Paris, 1889 Edition details Wikisource.
