= James Forrest (engineer) =

- Born: 30 November 1825; Westminster, London, England
- Died: 2 March 1917 (aged 91); St. Leonard's-on-Sea, East Sussex, England
- Monuments: James Forrest Medal
- Known for: Secretary of the Institution of Civil Engineers

James Forrest (30 November 1825 – 2 March 1917) was Secretary of the Institution of Civil Engineers from 1856 to 1896. Forrest was born in Westminster, London. At the age of 17, in 1842, he became apprenticed to engineers Edward and John Manby before later moving on to work for Thomas Grainger.

In 1850 he was contracted to assist Charles Manby catalogue the library of the Institution of Civil Engineers. Forrest edited the library catalogue published in 1851. He was briefly Assistant Secretary of the Royal Society of Arts before returning to the Institution of Civil Engineers in June 1856 as Assistant Secretary. In 1859 he was made Secretary of the Institution of Civil Engineers.

Forrest lived at 37 St. Michael's Grove in London during his career. He died in 1917 at his home in St. Leonard's-on-Sea.

The James Forrest Medal of the Institution of Civil Engineers was established in his honour upon his retirement in 1896.
