= Horseley Ironworks =

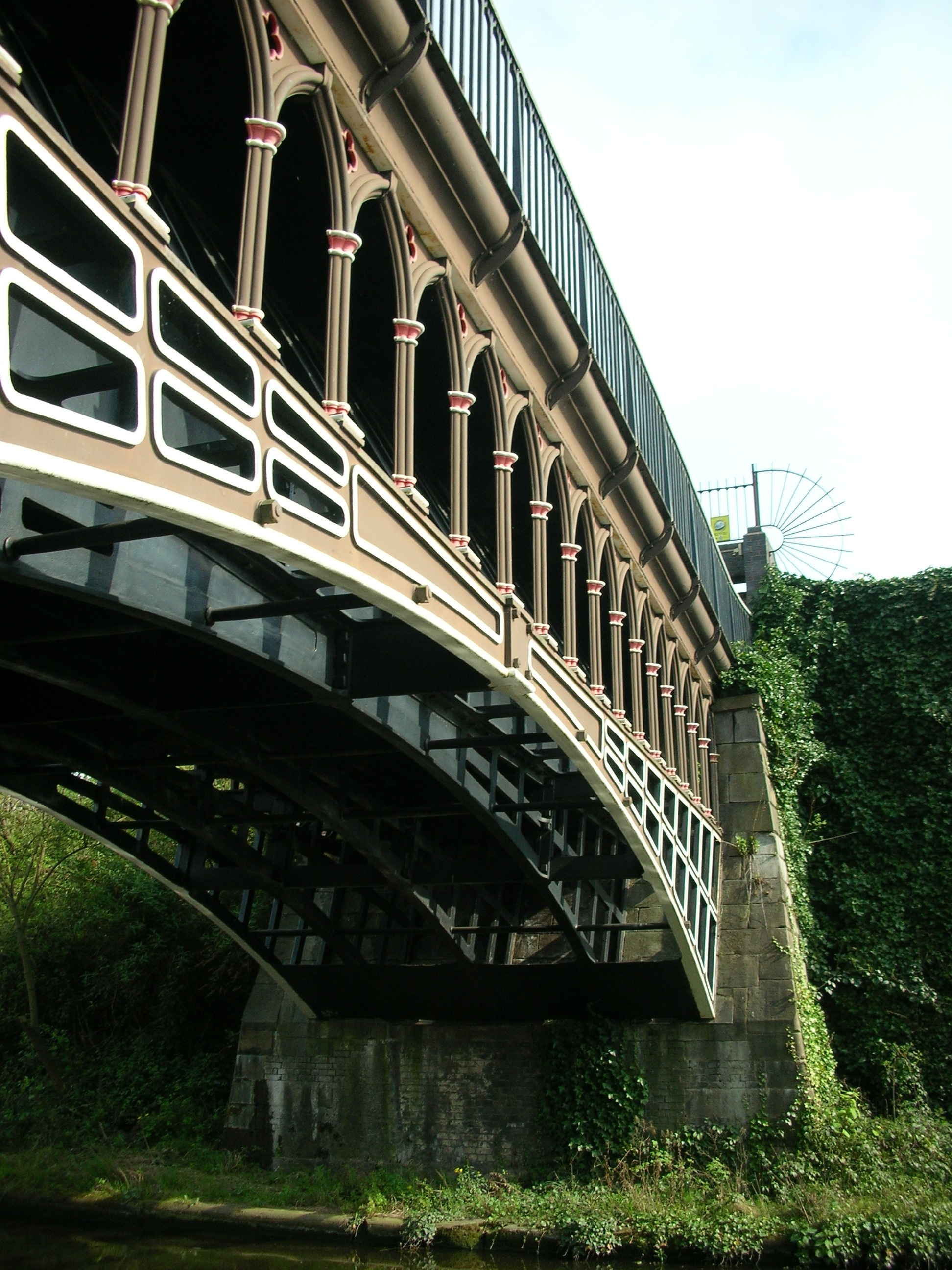
The Engine Arm Aqueduct

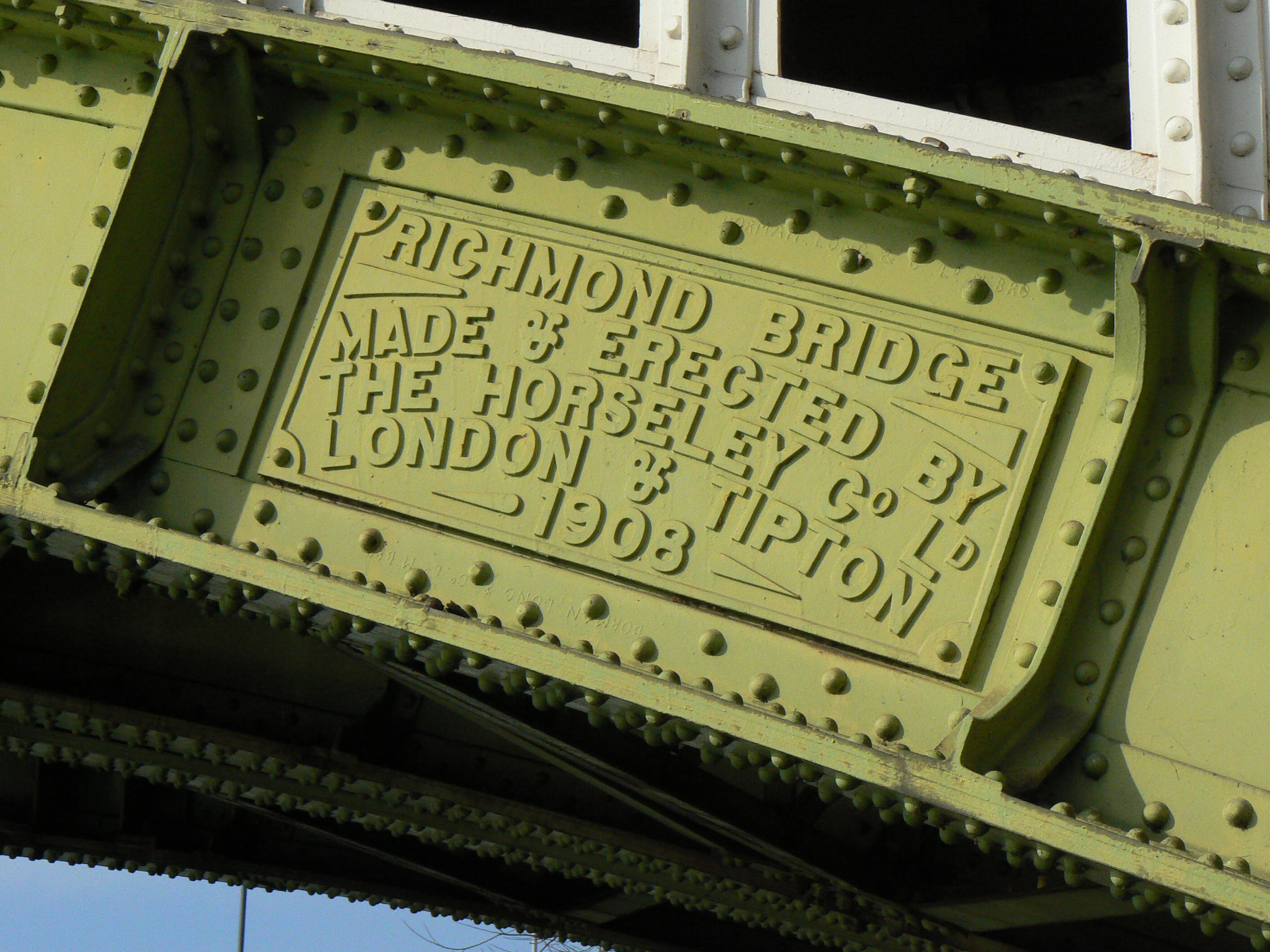
Plaque on Richmond Railway Bridge, London, inscribed "Richmond Bridge made & erected by the Horseley C^{o} L^{d} London & Tipton 1908"

The Horseley Ironworks (sometimes spelled Horsley) was a major ironworks in the Tipton area in the county of Staffordshire, now the West Midlands, England.

== History ==
Founded by Aaron Manby, it is most famous for constructing the first iron steamer, The Aaron Manby, in 1821. The boat was assembled at Rotherhithe. She was only the first of a number of steamboats built on the "knock-down" principle. The ironworks have also been responsible for the manufacture of numerous canal and railway bridges of the 19th century.

The ironworks were built near the Toll End Communication Canal on the Horseley estate, which had been sold by their owner at the turn of the 19th century due to demand from engineers wishing to profit on the construction of the BCN Main Line through the estate. The date when the ironworks were constructed is unknown but is believed to have been by 1815. Industry in the area prospered and the location retained the name of the Horseley estate as shown in an 1822 survey of the area.

With the increasing popularity of canals, the ironworks quickly became popular for manufacturing canal bridges, mainly in the local vicinity. Canal bridges made by the ironworks include the Engine Arm Aqueduct (1825), two roving bridges at Smethwick Junction (1828), Galton Bridge (1829), and Braunston Towpath Bridges (1830). By the end of the canal construction era, Horseley Ironworks had emerged as one of the most prolific manufacturers of canal bridges in the West Midlands region, especially in Birmingham. This was a result of their signature bridge design which had become popular amongst canal constructors. The design has been replicated more recently, for example in Birmingham during the regeneration of Gas Street Basin where Worcester Bar is linked to Gas Street.

Horseley Ironworks were also responsible for manufacturing in the railway industry. Railway bridges constructed included that of the viaduct for the London and Birmingham to Holyhead railway at Shifnal, Shropshire which was cast in 1848. As well as manufacturing bridges, they also produced locomotives.

The company also manufactured construction steelwork for the pier of Ryde, the Palace Theatre in London, Rugby railway station, a seaplane hangar in Las Palmas and the Dome of Discovery at the 1951 Festival of Britain.

People who have worked for the iron foundry include Charles Manby, the son of Aaron Manby, James Thomson, William Johnson and Richard Roberts.

=== Closing ===
The firm moved in 1865 to a site on the now defunct Dixon's Branch, off the BCN New Main Line (Island Line), near the South Staffordshire Railway line. The factory survived under a succession of owners until 1991, when it was closed down and subsequently redeveloped as a housing estate.

== Structures ==
It fabricated the steel for the 400 kV Thames Crossing in 1961.

== Locations ==
Point	Coordinates (Links to map resources)	OS Grid Ref	Notes
Horseley Ironworks (original site)	52.5338°N 2.0517°W	SO964929	on Toll End Communication Canal
Horseley Ironworks (later site)	52.5296°N 2.0438°W	SO970924	on Dixon's Branch

== Gallery ==
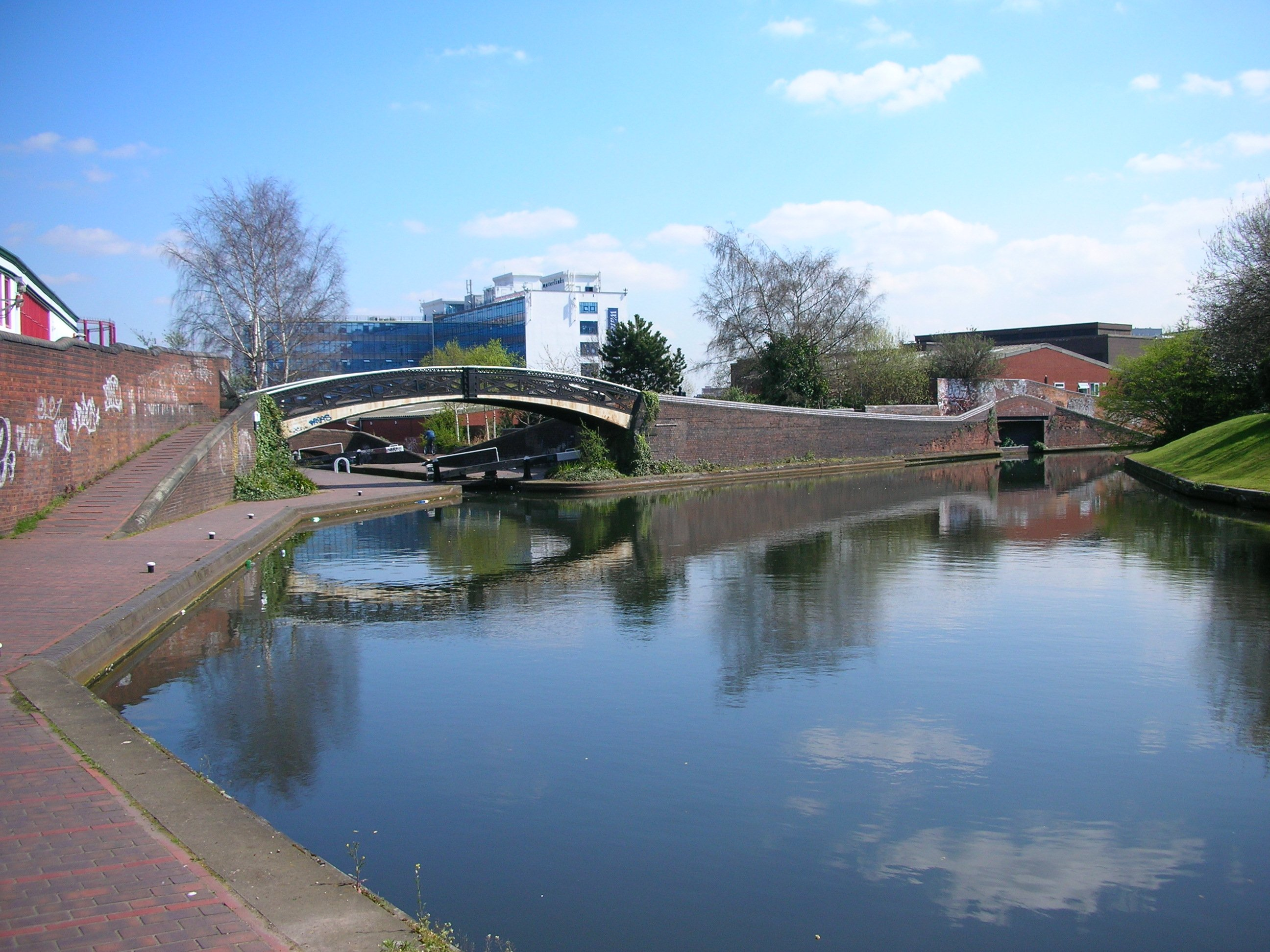
Aston Junction

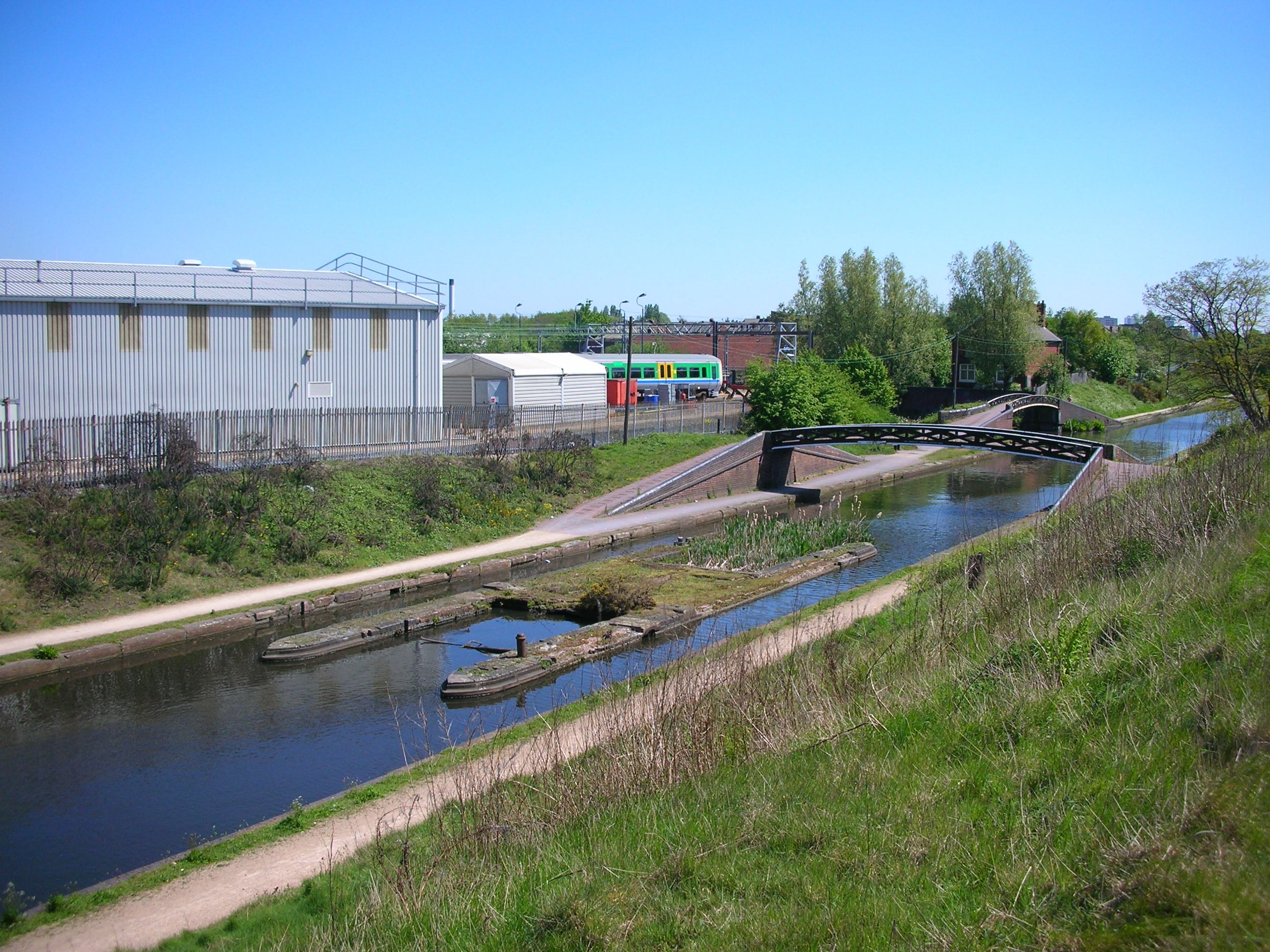
Winson Green Junction

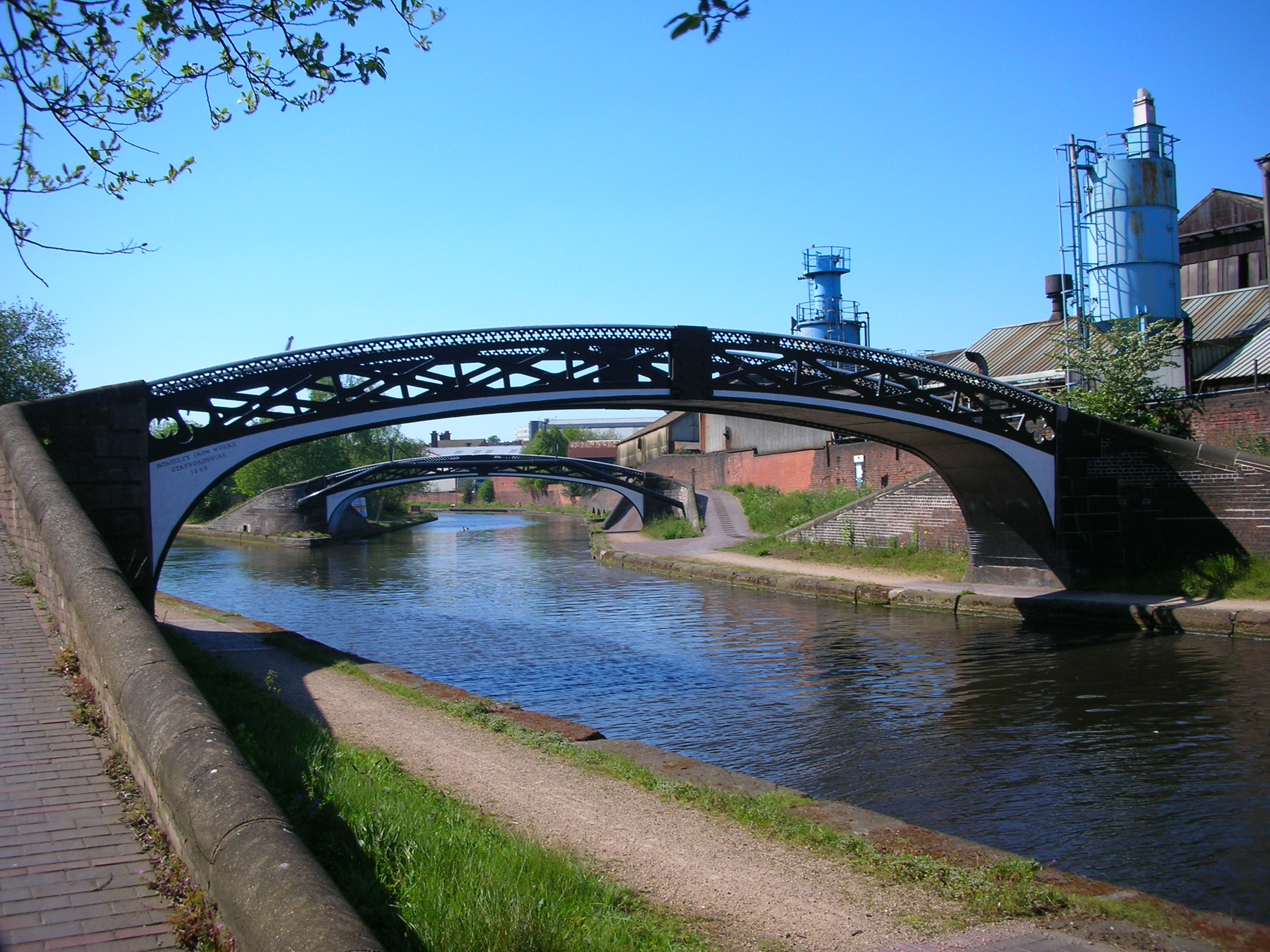
Two roving bridges at Smethwick Junction, 1828

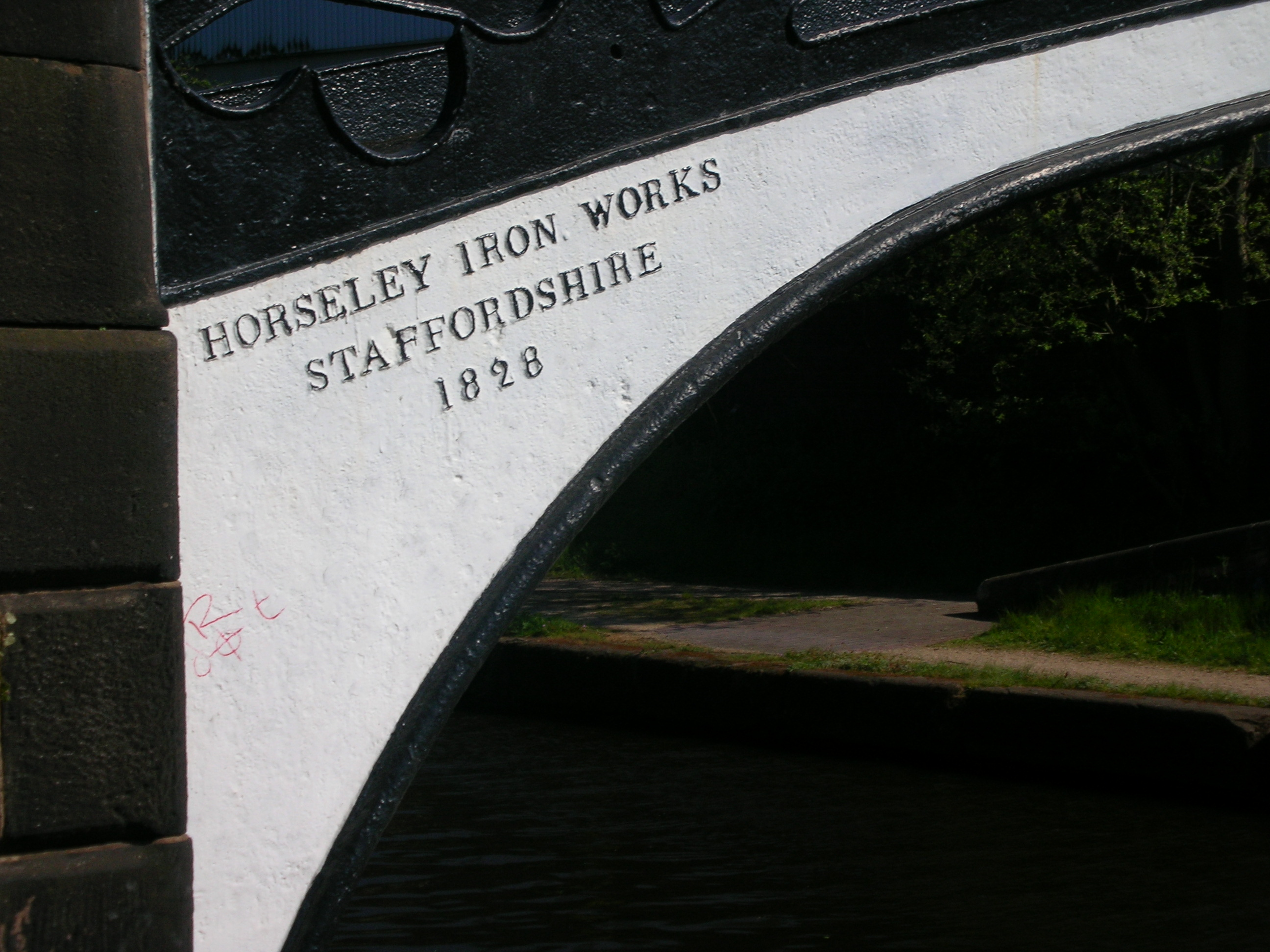
Name on roving bridge at Smethwick Junction

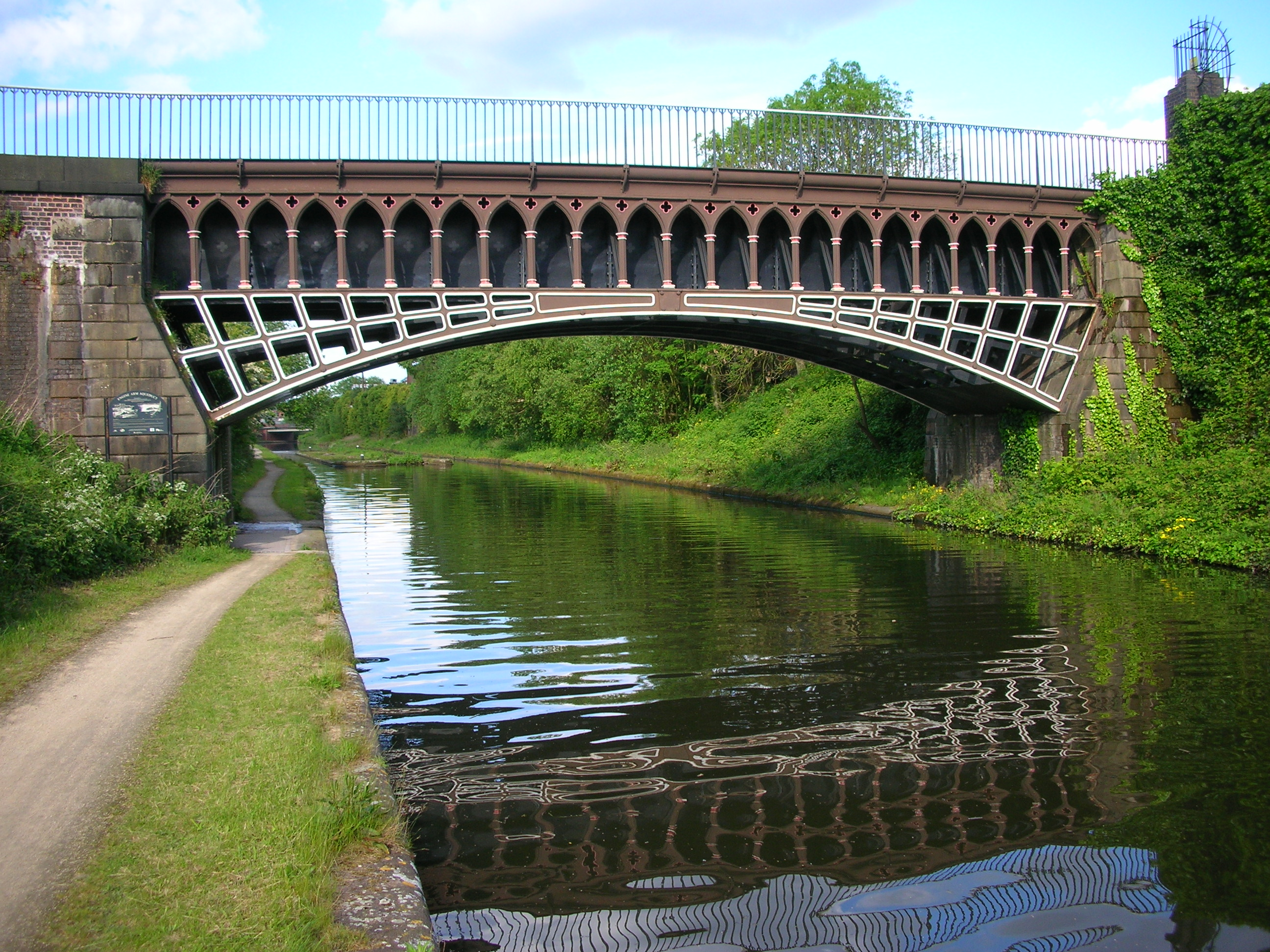
Engine Arm Aqueduct

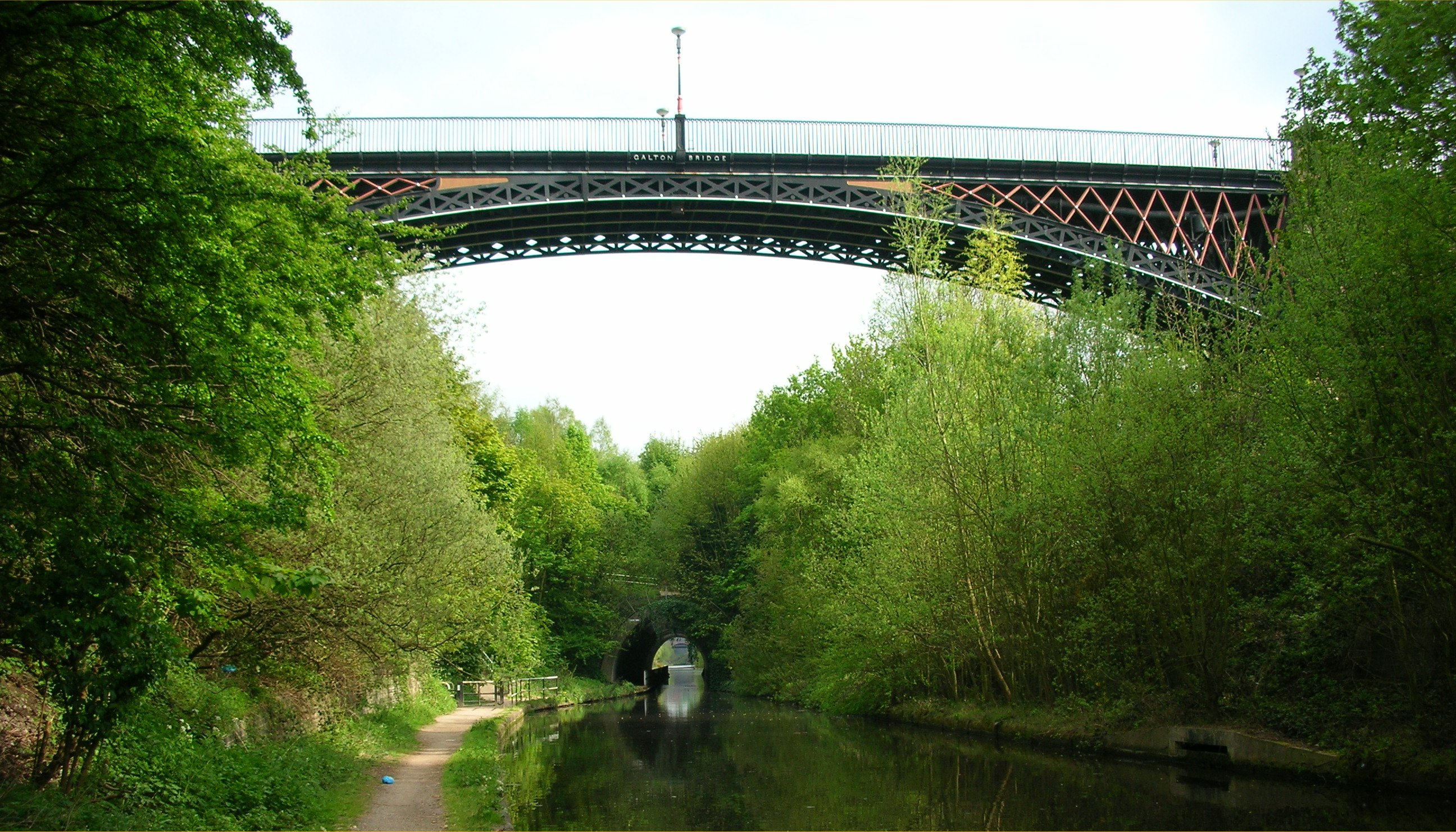
Galton Bridge

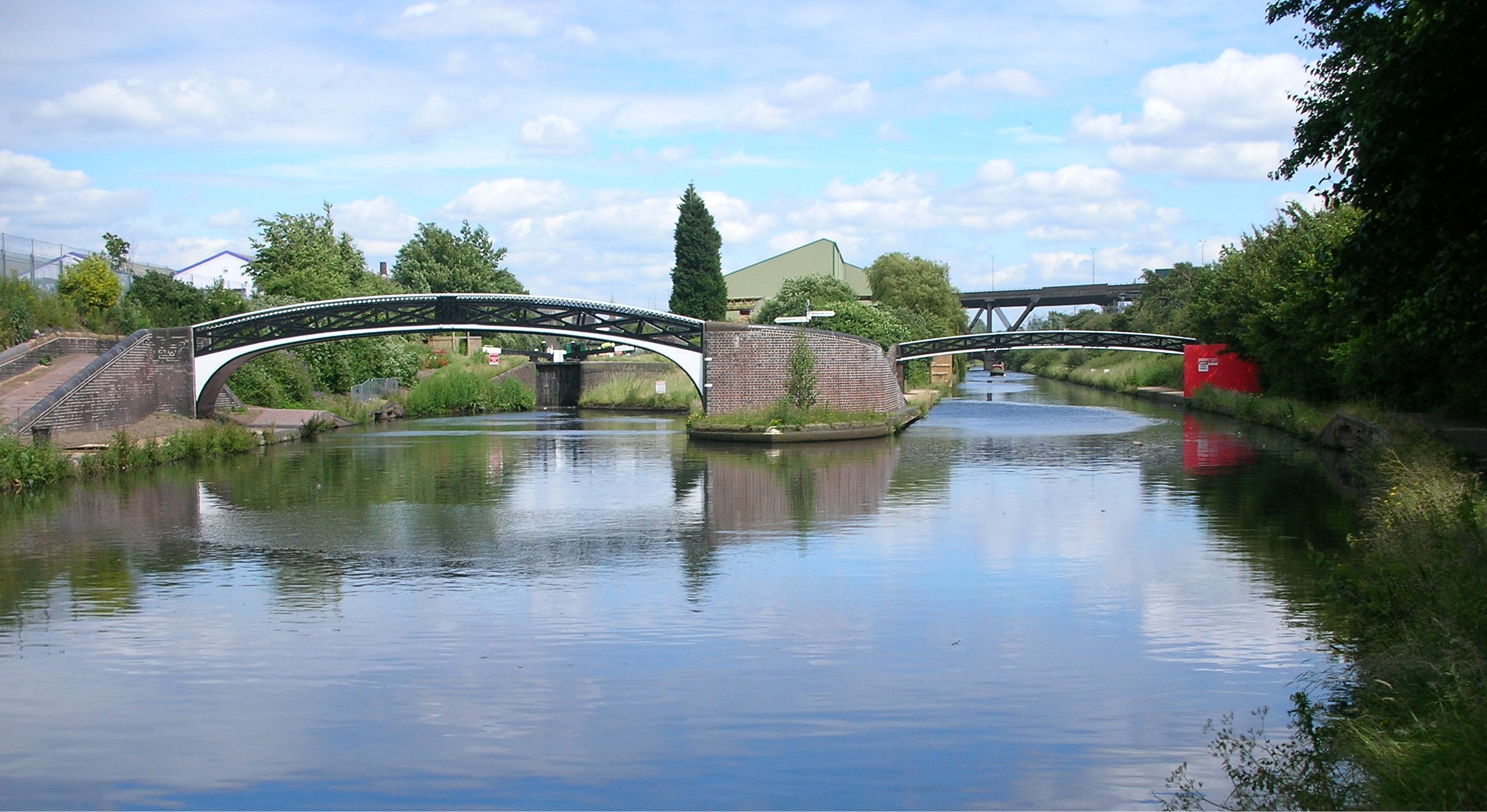
Two bridges at Bromford Junction

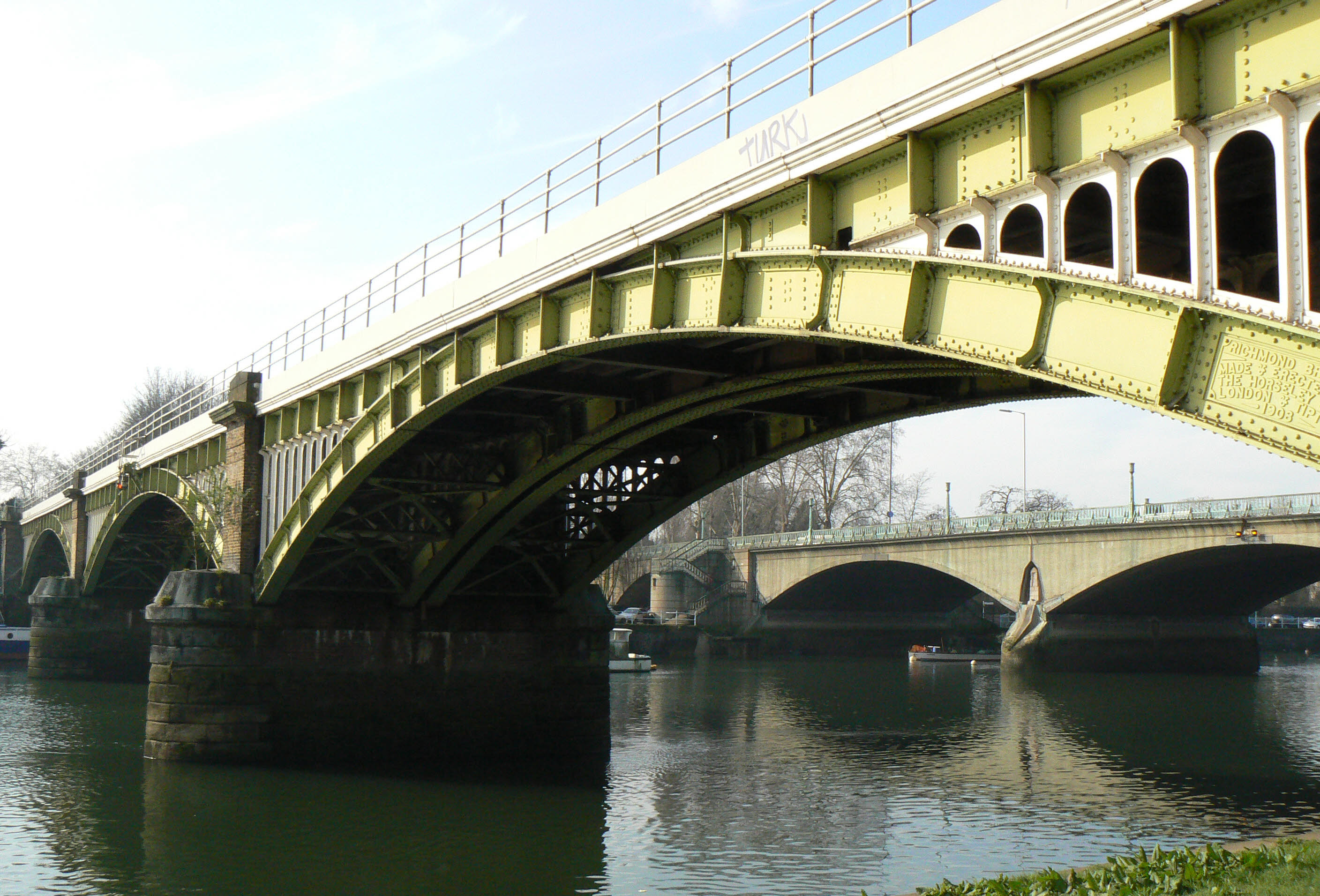
Richmond Railway Bridge

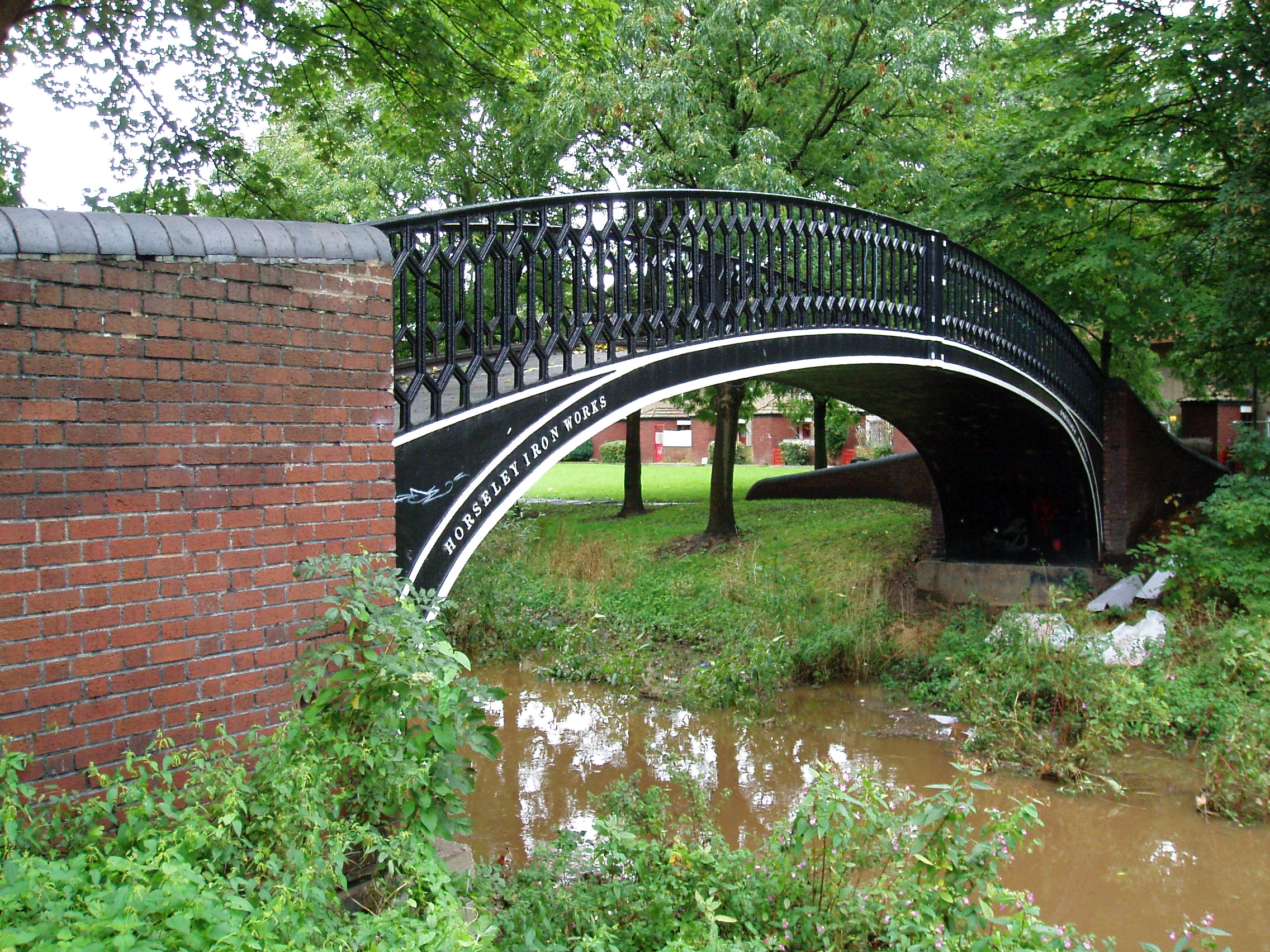
"Vignoles Bridge" in Coventry
