= Aaron Manby (ironmaster) =

English civil engineer (1776–1850)

- Born: 15 November 1776; Albrighton, east Shropshire, Shropshire
- Died: 1 December 1850 (aged 74); Shanklin, Isle of Wight
- Occupations: Ironmaster, Civil Engineer
- Employer: Horseley Ironworks
- Spouses: Julia Fewster, Sarah Ann Haskins
- Children: Charles, Sarah, John, Joseph, Edward,
- Parent(s): Aaron Manby, Jane Lane

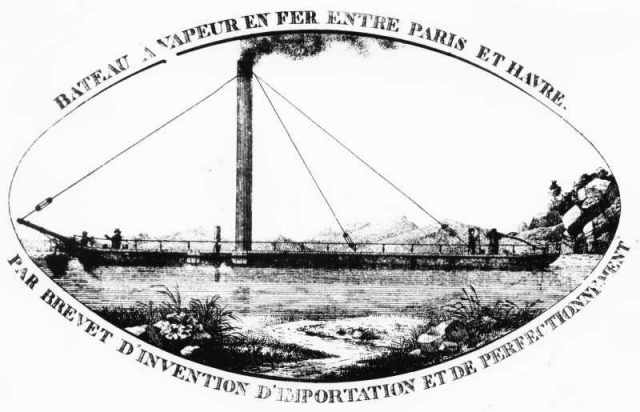
The Aaron Manby, the world's first seagoing iron-hulled ship

Aaron Manby (15 November 1776 – 1 December 1850) was an English civil engineer and the founder of the Horseley Ironworks, notable for the many fine iron canal bridges that it built. The eponymous Aaron Manby steamboat was the first iron-hulled steamer to go to sea, and it was driven by Manby's patent Oscillating Engine, an effective and durable marine steam engine.

== Family life ==
Manby was born at Albrighton, Shropshire on 15 November 1776 to Aaron Manby of Kingston, Jamaica and Jane Lane of Bentley.

Manby's first wife was Julia Fewster. They had a son, Charles Manby, who became Secretary of the Institution of Civil Engineers. Julia died in 1807.

In 1807 Manby married Sarah Ann Haskins, with whom he had one daughter, Sarah Maria (d. 1826), and four more sons. The oldest three of them, John Richard (1813-1869), Joseph Lane (1814-1862), and Edward Oliver (1816-1864), also became civil engineers. Sarah Ann died in 1826.

== Career ==
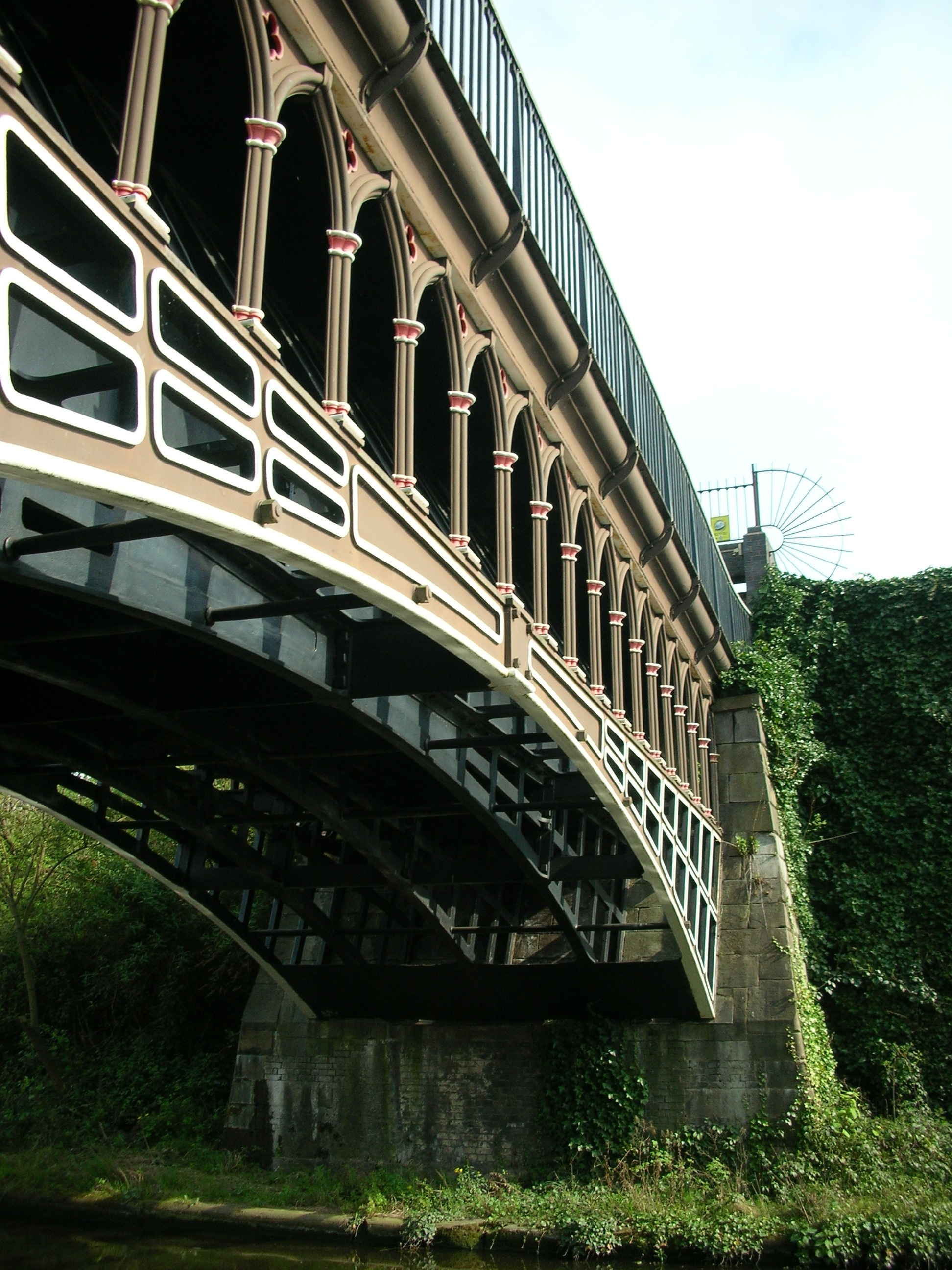
Engine Arm Aqueduct, 1828, one of Manby's iron canal bridges in the English Midlands

Manby's working life was originally in banks on the Isle of Wight.

In 1812 Manby was managing partner of the Horseley Coal and Iron Co, Tipton, Staffordshire. It ran coal mines, blast furnaces to make iron, and assorted workshops. Manby expanded the business into civil engineering.

In 1813 Manby obtained patent No 3705 for a means of casting the slag from blast furnaces into blocks for building. In 1815, the firm supplied a cast-iron swing bridge, possibly the first of Horseley's many iron bridges.

In 1821, diversifying into mechanical engineering, Manby obtained British Patent No 4558 for his "oscillating engine" designed for use in ships. That same year, Horseley Ironworks constructed the world's first seagoing iron steamboat, named the Aaron Manby, using his oscillating engine. The boat was built at Tipton using temporary bolts, disassembled for transportation to London, and reassembled on the Thames in 1822, this time using permanent rivets.

Between 1819 and 1822, Manby started his engineering works at Charenton-le-Pont, near Paris, with the Scottish chemist Daniel Wilson as manager. This controversial move enabled France to stop buying engines made in England, which made Manby somewhat unpopular.

In 1822 Manby and Wilson's Compagnie d'Éclairage par de Gaz Hydrogène ('Hydrogen Gas Lighting Company') was granted the right to provide gas lighting for several streets in Paris. According to Michel Cotte, "The company Manby & Wilson is certainly the largest company of British origin which set up in France under the Restoration." Their "Compagnie Anglaise" ran until 1847, expanding to take in the Le Creusot ironworks.

Manby's Horseley Ironworks profited from the growing canal trade, manufacturing canal bridges in the English Midlands including the Engine Arm Aqueduct (1825) and two roving bridges at Smethwick Junction (1828).

In 1845 Manby sold Horseley Ironworks to John Joseph Bramah (~1798 - 1846), nephew of the inventor and locksmith Joseph Bramah.

After returning from France in about 1840, he lived at Fulham, London, before retiring to the Isle of Wight where he died.
