= Sampson Lloyd (disambiguation) =

Sampson Lloyd II was an English iron manufacturer and banker of the 18th century, who co-founded Lloyds Bank.

Sampson Lloyd may also refer to:

- Sampson Lloyd (iron manufacturer) (1664–1724), English iron manufacturer, father of Sampson Lloyd
- Sampson Lloyd (MP) (1820–1889), British banker and Conservative Party politician
