= Sampson Lloyd (iron manufacturer) =

Welsh iron manufacturer

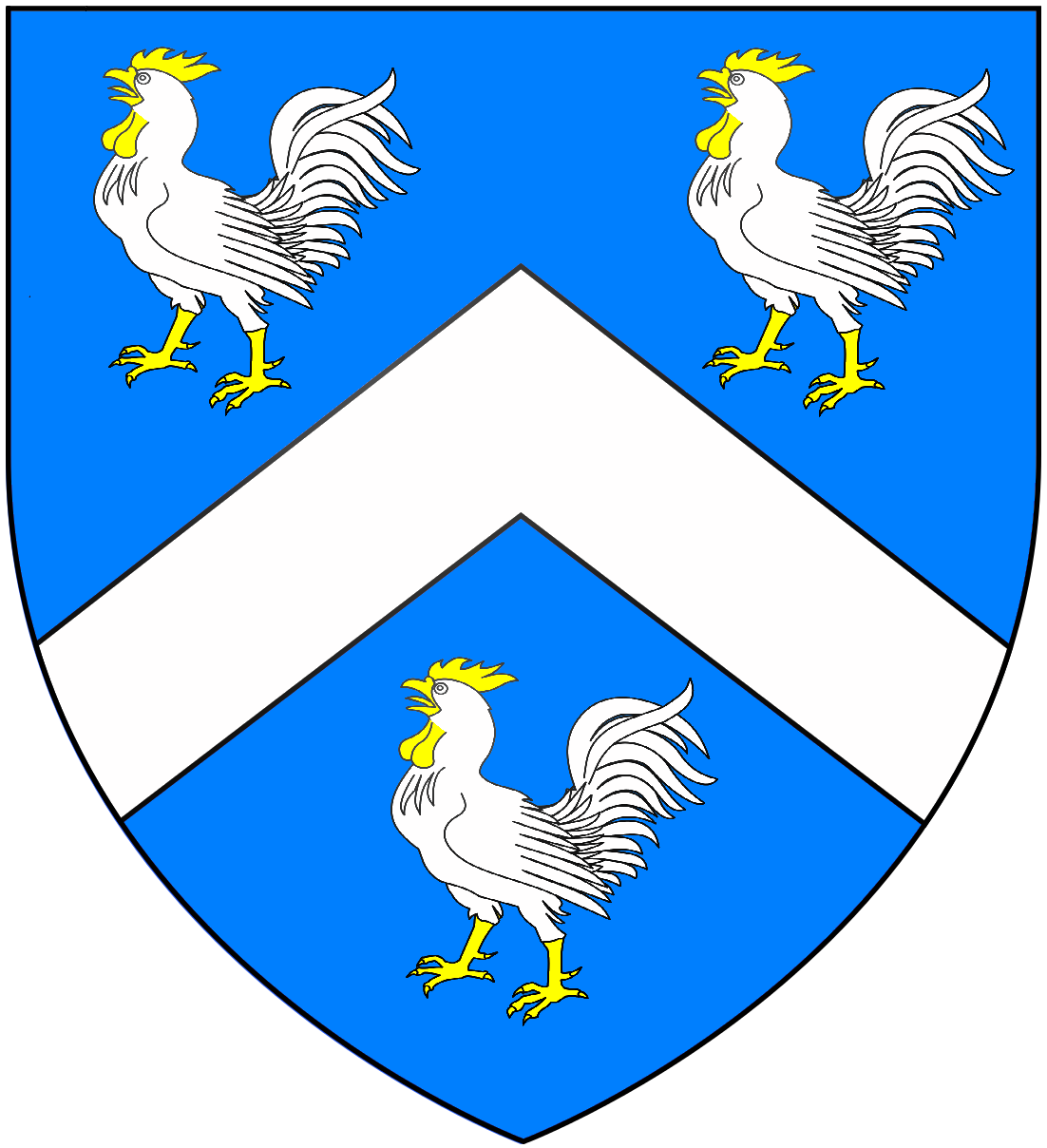
- Arms of Lloyd of Dolobran, Montgomeryshire, Wales (of which family were the Lloyd Quakers, bankers and steel manufacturers of Birmingham and Baron Lloyd of Dolobran: Azure, a chevron between three cocks argent armed crested and wattled or)
- Born: 1664; Welshpool, Wales
- Died: 3 January 1724 (aged 59–60)
- Occupation: Ironmonger
- Known for: Founding the Lloyd family of Birmingham
- Spouses: Elizabeth Good (died 1692) Mary Crowley (m. 1695)
- Children: 10, including Sampson Lloyd II
- Relatives: Thomas Lloyd (uncle); Charles Lloyd (grandson)

Sampson Lloyd (1664 – 3 January 1724) was a Welsh iron manufacturer in Birmingham, then a small town in the county of Warwickshire, England, and was the founder of the Lloyd family of Birmingham, iron-founders and bankers, which went on to found Lloyds Bank, today one of the largest banks in the United Kingdom.

== Early life ==
Sampson Lloyd was the younger son of Charles Lloyd (1637–1698) of Dolobran in Montgomeryshire (now Powys), where the Lloyd family had been established gentry for many centuries. Lloyd's mother was his father's first wife Elizabeth Lort (1633–1685), daughter of Sampson Lort (died before 1670) of East Moor in Pembrokeshire, one of the three sons of Henry Lort of Stackpole Court in Pembrokeshire, Sheriff of Pembrokeshire in 1619, of whom the eldest was Sir Roger Lort, 1st Baronet (died 1664), created a baronet in 1662.

Lloyd was born in 1664 at Anne Eccleston's in Welshpool, the rented house where his parents had been held for the previous two years under house arrest, having been transferred from the Welshpool jail, and where they would remain for the next eight years. As Quakers, they had refused to take the Oath of Allegiance to King Charles II (1660–1685) as required by the Quaker Act 1662, the swearing of oaths being forbidden by the Quaker religion.

== Career ==
Lloyd adhered to the Quaker faith which had been adopted by his father and aged 34 in the year 1698, the year of his father's death, leaving his elder brother Charles Lloyd (1662–1747), who had inherited Dolobran, he deserted the "uncharitableness of his native Wales" and moved about 62 miles south-east of Dolobran to the town of Birmingham in Warwickshire (home of his brother-in-law John Pemberton), a town especially tolerant of Quakers and religious dissent. There he could escape the harassing and ruthless legal penalties of the Conventicles Act and Five Mile Act, for as Birmingham was not then a borough, dissenting preachers were not barred from preaching there. He might have been tempted to follow thousands of other Welsh dissenters in emigrating to the new American colony of Pennsylvania, which course had been chosen by his uncle Thomas Lloyd (1640–1694) a Quaker and preacher who assisted William Penn in the establishment of that colony, which he served as Deputy-Governor and President from 1684 to 1693.

However, Birmingham had other attractions than religious toleration to Lloyd. It was a place where due to the absence of guilds controlling trade and industry, it was easy to establish a business or factory. There he "soon found scope for his energies and capital" and became an ironmaster and established a slitting mill at the bottom of Bradford Street, Birmingham, on the bank of the River Rea, where by use of water power, sheet iron was cut-up to form nails. Slitting mills were especially plentiful on the River Stour between Stourbridge (where Lloyd's father-in-law Ambrose Crowley operated) and Stourport. He also started business as an iron merchant in Edgbaston Street, Birmingham, in which he lived at number 56. He had a profitable career in the firm he founded called "Sampson Lloyd and Sons".

=== Description of Lloyd's mills ===
In a map of Birmingham dated 1731, 7 years after Samuel's death, Lloyd's slitting and corn mills are shown with access from Digbeth by Lower Mill Lane. A later map dated 1751 shows the slitting-mill with a mill pool and a large garden. A description of the slitting mill survives in a letter dated 31 July 1755 written by visitors from London to the Pembertons, Lloyd cousins:

Next Morning (Monday) [July 1755] we went to see Mr. L 's Slitting Mill, which is too curious to pass by without notice. Its use is to prepare iron for making nails. The process is as follows: they take a large iron bar, and with a huge pair of shears, work'd by a water-wheel, cut it into lengths of about a foot each; these pieces are put into a furnace, and heated red-hot, then taken out and put between a couple of steel rollers, which draw them to the length of about four feet, and the breadth of about three inches; thence they are immediately put between two other rollers, which having a number of sharp edges fitting each other like scissors, cut the bar as it passes thro' into about eight square rods; after the rods are cold, they are tied up in bundles for the nailor's use. We din'd and spent the evening (after walking again to Dudson) at Mr. Lloyd's.

== Personal life ==
Lloyd married twice. His first wife was Elizabeth Good (died 1692), by whom he had four daughters. After her death, he remarried in 1695 to Mary Crowley (born 1677), whose sister Sarah Crowley had married his elder brother Charles Lloyd (1662–1747) of Dolobran. Mary and Sarah were daughters of Ambrose Crowley, a Quaker Blacksmith in Stourbridge, Worcestershire (near Birmingham) and Sheriff of London. The brother of the two sisters was Sir Ambrose Crowley (1658–1713), an ironmonger, whose daughter Elizabeth Crowley was the wife of John St John, 11th Baron St John of Bletso (died 1757). During the time of Sir Ambrose III's management, the Crowley Iron Works at Winlaton, Winlaton Mill, and at Swalwell, all in County Durham were probably Europe's biggest industrial complex. Sir Ambrose lent large sums to the government which appointed him a founding director of the South Sea Company. By his second wife Mary Crowley he had four sons and two daughters including:

- Charles Lloyd (1696–1741), eldest son and heir, who after his father's death and in partnership with his younger brother Samuel Lloyd, acquired the Town Mills in Birmingham. (Note: The Town Mill was originally a corn mill. Per 'Economic and Social History: Mills', in A History of the County of Warwick: Volume 7, the City of Birmingham, ed. W B Stephens (London, 1964), pp. 253–269 : "In the early 18th century it ("Town Mills") was used, at least partly, as a slitting mill, and was called Farmer's Slitting Mill. James Farmer, ironmonger, was paying rent for the 'Town Mill' in 1720, and in 1728 Joseph Farmer obtained a lease of 'a water corn mill called the Town Mill'. Charles Lloyd occupied the mill in 1731, when it was called Lloyd's Slitting and Corn Mills") In 1728 he acquired further, from Thomas, Bishop of Bangor, and in partnership with his younger brother Sampson Lloyd, a lease of the Forge or Blademill in Saultley, Aston, being described in the lease as "ironmongers". He inherited his father's residence at 56 Edgbaston Street, Birmingham, but later moved to Bingley House on Broad Street (later demolished to build the Bingley Hall, itself demolished and replaced by the present International Convention Centre and Symphony Hall. He married Sarah Careless, daughter of Benjamin Careless, by whom he had children including Charles Lloyd (1724–1760) and Benjamin Lloyd (1727–1804). His heir to his industrial enterprises was his younger brother Sampson Lloyd.
- Ambrose Lloyd (1698–1742), second son.
- Sampson Lloyd II (1699–1779), third son, who co-founded Lloyds Bank, built the mansion house "Farm" and for whom "everything came right".

== Property and landholdings ==
Lloyd owned a large house at 56 Edgbaston Street, Birmingham and freehold property in Stourbridge and had a residence at Lea, near Leominster, in Herefordshire.

== Death ==
Lloyd died aged 60 on 3 January 1724. The executors to his will were his widow, his son Sampson II, his son-in-law John Gulson and his brother-in-law John Pemberton.

== Sources and further reading ==
=== Lloyd Family History ===
- Gilbert, T.R., & Boothroyd, J.B., The Lloyds of Lloyd's Bank, Supplement to "The Dark Horse", Lloyds Bank Staff Magazine, June, 1951, 24pp.
- Anna Lloyd (Braithwaite) Thomas (1924). The Quaker seekers of Wales: A story of the Lloyds of Dolobran.
- Lloyd, Humphrey, Quaker Lloyds in the Industrial Revolution, 1660-1860, 1975
- Lewys Dunn (1846), Heraldic Visitations of Wales and Part of the Marches, Vol 1, pg. 294.
- Lowe, Rachel J., Farm and its Inhabitants with Some Account of the Lloyds of Dolobran, London, 1883. (Farm is a mansion in Sparkbrook, Birmingham).
- Rees T. M.(1925), A history of the Quakers in Wales and their emigration to North America
- Lloyd family, of Dolobran, Mont., Dictionary of Welsh Biography
- Lloyd, Samuel, The Lloyds of Birmingham with some Account of the Founding of Lloyd's Bank, 2nd Edition, Birmingham & London, 1907. The author Samuel Lloyd (1827–1918) was the owner and occupant of Farm in 1907 (per p. 32)
- Burke's Genealogical and Heraldic History of the Landed Gentry, 15th Edition, ed. Pirie-Gordon, H., London, 1937, pp. 1392-3, pedigree of Lloyd of Dolobran
- Burke, John, A Genealogical and Heraldic History of the Commoners of Great Britain and Ireland, Vol.4, London, 1838, pp. 107–114, pedigree of "Lloyd of Dolobran"
- Dolobran Estate Records, National Library of wales, ref: GB 0210 DOLOBRAN
- Lloyd, Alan, Cousins' Party at the Downs School, 29th May 2004[www.lordsmeade.freeserve.co.uk/colwalltalk-al.rtf] (esp. re later descent of Farm)
