= Lloyd family =

Lloyd family may refer to:

- Lloyd family (Dolobran), of Dolobran, Montgomeryshire
- Lloyd family (Birmingham), from Birmingham, England, branch of above
- Lloyd family (Maryland), from Talbot County, Maryland
