= Alan Scrivener Lloyd =

British Army lieutenant

- Born: October 15, 1888; Birmingham, United Kingdom
- Died: August 4, 1916 (aged 27); Ypres, France
- Spouse: Dorothy Margaret Hewetson (m. 1914)
- Children: David Alan Lloyd
- Relatives: Ronald Lloyd (brother), Eric Lloyd (brother), Gerald Lloyd (brother)
- Military career
- Branch: Artillery
- Service years: 1914-1916
- Rank: Lieutenant
- Awards: 1914/15 Star, British War Medal, Military Cross, Victory Medal

Alan Scrivener Lloyd MC, R.F.A . (October 15, 1888 - August 4, 1916) was a British Royal Field Artillery Lieutenant who was killed at Ypres.

== Early life ==
Alan Scrivener Lloyd was born in 1888, to the Lloyd family of Birmingham and was related to Sampson Lloyd and Bertram Lloyd. Alan was born to John Henry Lloyd (1855–1944) and Gertrude E. Lloyd (1858–1923).

He attended Leighton Park School in 1901 and became President of Debating Society, Secretary of Essay Society, Sub editor of The Leightonian magazine.

Following his time at school, he became a farmer and attended Trinity College Cambridge in the 1910s. On September 1, 1914, Lloyd married Dorothy Margaret Hewetson and on October 2, 1915, they had their only child, David Alan Lloyd.

== Military career ==
On September 29, 1914, Lloyd enlisted in the C Battery, 78th Brigade, 17th Division Royal Field Artillery and became a Second Lieutenant without the support of his family, who were Quakers and believed in Pacifism. In July 1915, he was sent to France and Belgium to fight in World War I. On January 31, 1916, Lloyd was promoted to the rank of Lieutenant. On August 4, 1916, Lloyd with a few other men, were repairing a telephone wire when they were hit by an artillery shell and instantly killed. Following his death, Lloyd was posthumously awarded the Military Cross.
