= Dolobran, Montgomeryshire =

Historic estate in Powys, Wales

Coordinates: 52°42′03″N 3°18′21″W

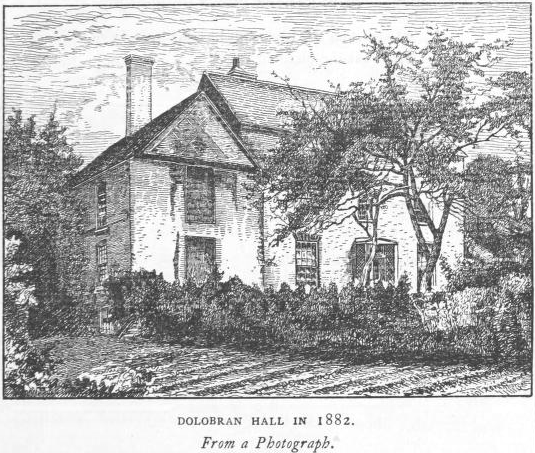
Engraving titled: "Dolobran Hall in 1882, from a photograph"

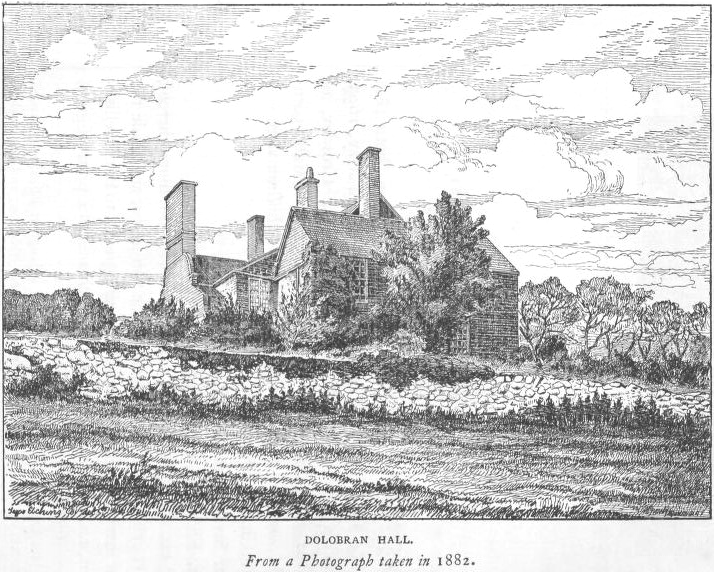
Engraving titled: "Dolobran Hall, from a photograph taken in 1882"

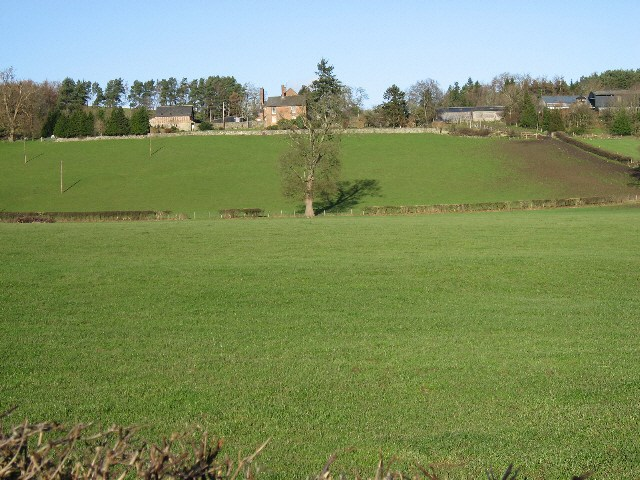
Dolobran Hall and farm buildings, in 2007, looking northward

Dolobran, in the county of Montgomeryshire (now Powys) in Wales, is a historic estate which was the earliest known seat of the expansive Lloyd family, prominent Quakers, of which in the 18th century a junior branch, the Lloyd family of Birmingham, seated at Farm, Bordesley, became prominent in and around Birmingham as iron-founders and founded Lloyds Bank, today one of the largest banks in the United Kingdom. The grade II* listed manor house known as Dolobran Hall about 8 miles north-west of the town of Welshpool, is situated in the parish of Meifod (Note: In the parish of Meifod, per Dictionary of Welsh Biography) to the west of the village of Meifod and to the east of the village of Pontrobert. One of the family historians, Humphrey Lloyd (1975), estimated the historic estate of Dolobran to have comprised about 1,000 acres. In 2015 Dolobran Hall and its 70-acre estate are used for farming and industrial training by the J.M. Evans Partnership. John Meirion Evans (1926–2015) of Dolobran Hall by his wife Edith was father to Maurice, Keith and Robert. In 2008 former farmer Rob Evans founded a company to train construction workers in the use of plant and machinery called "Training For The Future", based at "The Brick Barn Dolobran Hall".

== Lloyd of Birmingham ==
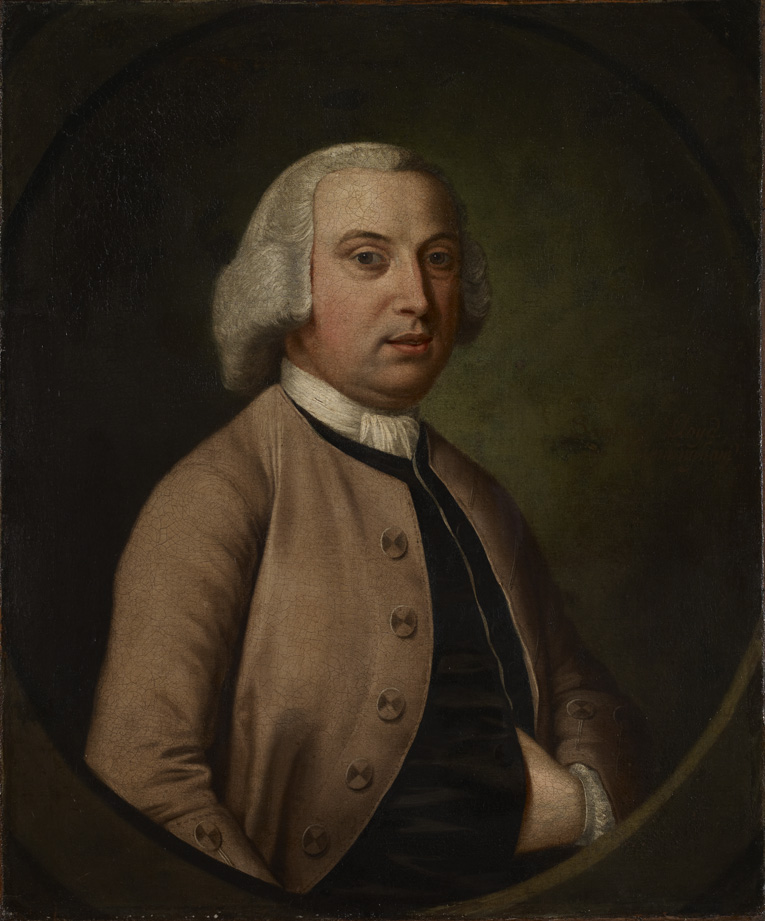
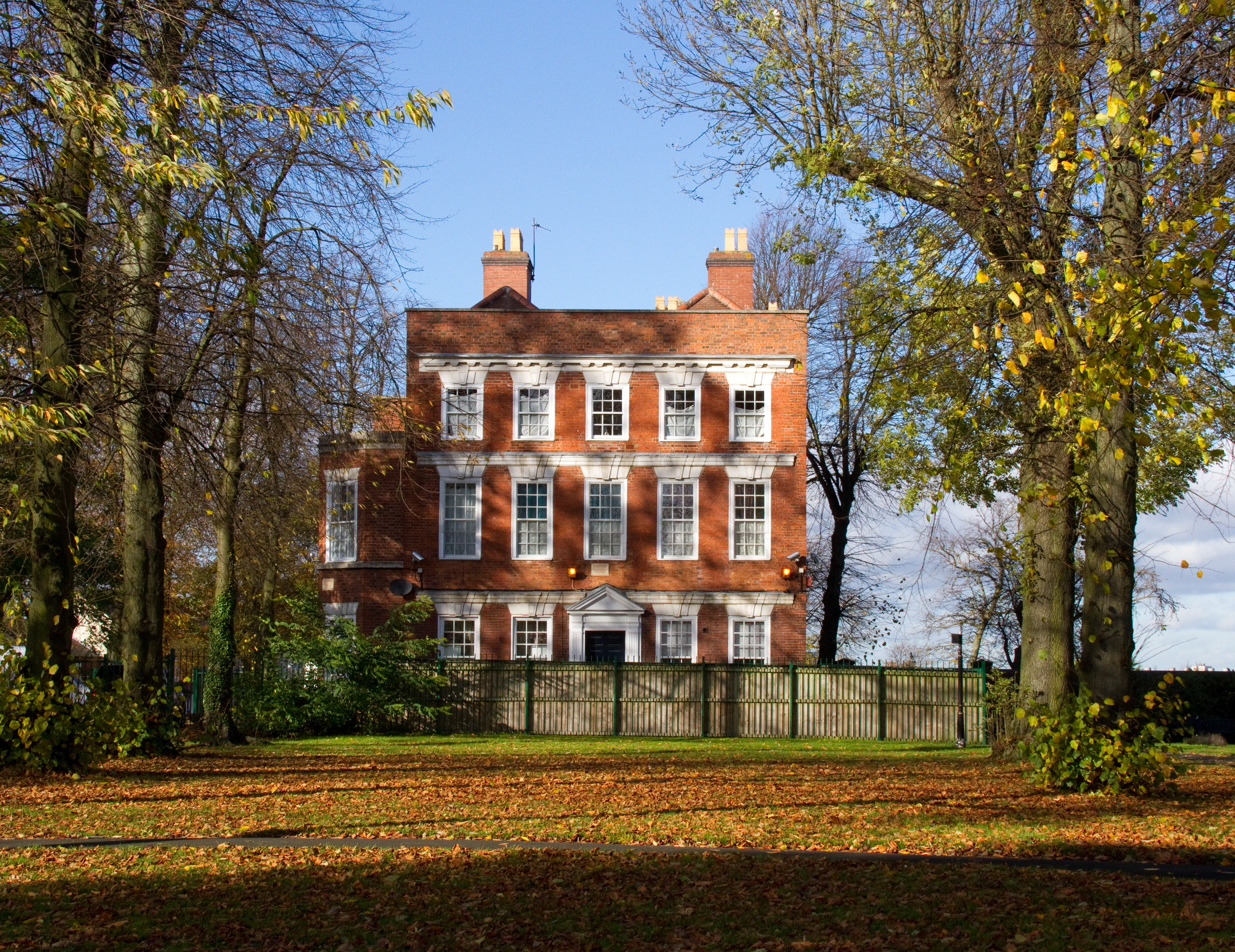
Portrait of Sampson II Lloyd (1699 - 1779) an iron-master and co-founder of Lloyds Bank. Collection of Birmingham Museum and Art Gallery. His residence was the estate of "Farm", the former 56-acre Owen's Farm with an Elizabethan farmhouse in the manor of Bordesley, now in the locality of Sparkbrook, which he purchased and where he built "Farm" an eponymous mansion house, which survives as a grade II* listed building known today as "Lloyd's Farmhouse, Farm Park, 139 Sampson Road, Birmingham", one of the most important of the rare surviving Georgian buildings in the city of Birmingham. (right). The original "Owen's Farmhouse" still stood in the grounds of the Georgian house in 1907, "a very beautiful piece of Tudor architecture", possibly then the oldest house in Birmingham. Lloyd spent most of his time in his large town house in Edgbaston Street returning to Farm, his rural retreat, at weekends. Over time the location became unfashionable and surrounded by housing, and the family moved to Edgbaston Grove, a home in a more fashionable location. Farm was donated to the City in the 1920s by John Henry Lloyd (1855–1944), of Edgbaston Grove, Birmingham, Lord Mayor of Birmingham in 1901-1902 (only son of George Braithwaite Lloyd (1824–1903) by his wife Mary Hutchinson) and the grounds laid out as a public park. One of his four sons, Alan Scrivener Lloyd (died 1916), MC, broke the family tradition of pacifism and was killed in action at Ypres in World War I. It is now a regional home for the Bromford Housing Group. "Farm Park" (bounded by Sampson Road, Kendall Road, (Note: Kendall in Westmorland was the home of the Braithwaite family, a daughter of which became the wife of Samuel Lloyd (1768–1849)) Dolobran Road and a row of terraces on Dearman Road (Note: Mary Dearman (died 1826) was the wife of George Braithwaite Lloyd (1794–1857)) (all names connected with the Lloyd family)) within which "Farm House" stands today, is a public park consisting of part of the former grounds of the mansion, surrounded by a densely built urban landscape, referred to now as "The Capital of British Pakistan" (Note: The BBC sitcom Citizen Khan focuses on the life of Mr Khan and his family, Pakistani immigrants in the Sparkhill area, which it dubbed "The capital of British Pakistan" in the credits) and the centre of Birmingham's "Balti Triangle"

The Lloyd family of Birmingham, a junior branch of Lloyd of Dolobran, were iron-founders and bankers descended from Sampson Lloyd (1699–1779) of "Farm", anciently in the manor of Bordesley, now in the locality of Sparkbrook, who with his eldest son Sampson Lloyd (1728–1807) founded Lloyds Bank.

== Surviving house ==
A fragment only survives of the manor house of Dolobran which was from 1486 to 1780 the home of the Lloyds. It comprises today a three-bay brick-built house with a small wing with William and Mary panelling downstairs, and a sizeable external brick chimney to the rear with shaped late 17th century supports. This joins onto a later block built onto the house in about 1830.

== Quaker Meeting House ==
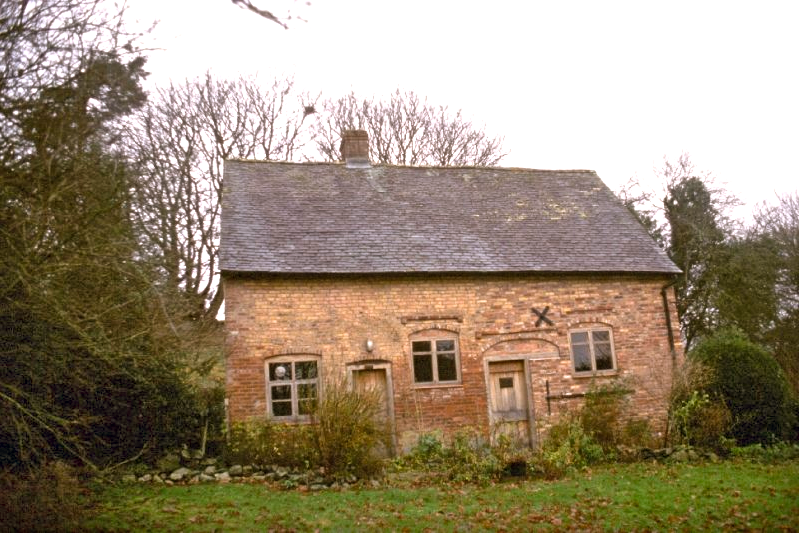
The Quaker Meeting House at Dolobran

The Quaker Meeting House at Dolobran is an important monument in the history of the Quaker movement in the British Isles. It was built in 1701 by Charles Lloyd (1662–1747) of Dolobran, whose father Charles Lloyd (1637–1698) of Dolobran was the first in the family to become a Quaker. It consists of a tiny isolated chapel built of red-brick with drip courses over the cambered windows and comprising also a two-bay cottage under the same roof. The grade II* listed structure is an early example of brick building in Montgomeryshire. Today the Glyndŵr's Way long-distance footpath passes nearby. Among the members of the Quaker meeting were the Lloyd family of Dolobran. Meetings ceased in 1828 but the building was restored by the Quakers in about 1970.

== Descent ==
=== Lloyd ===
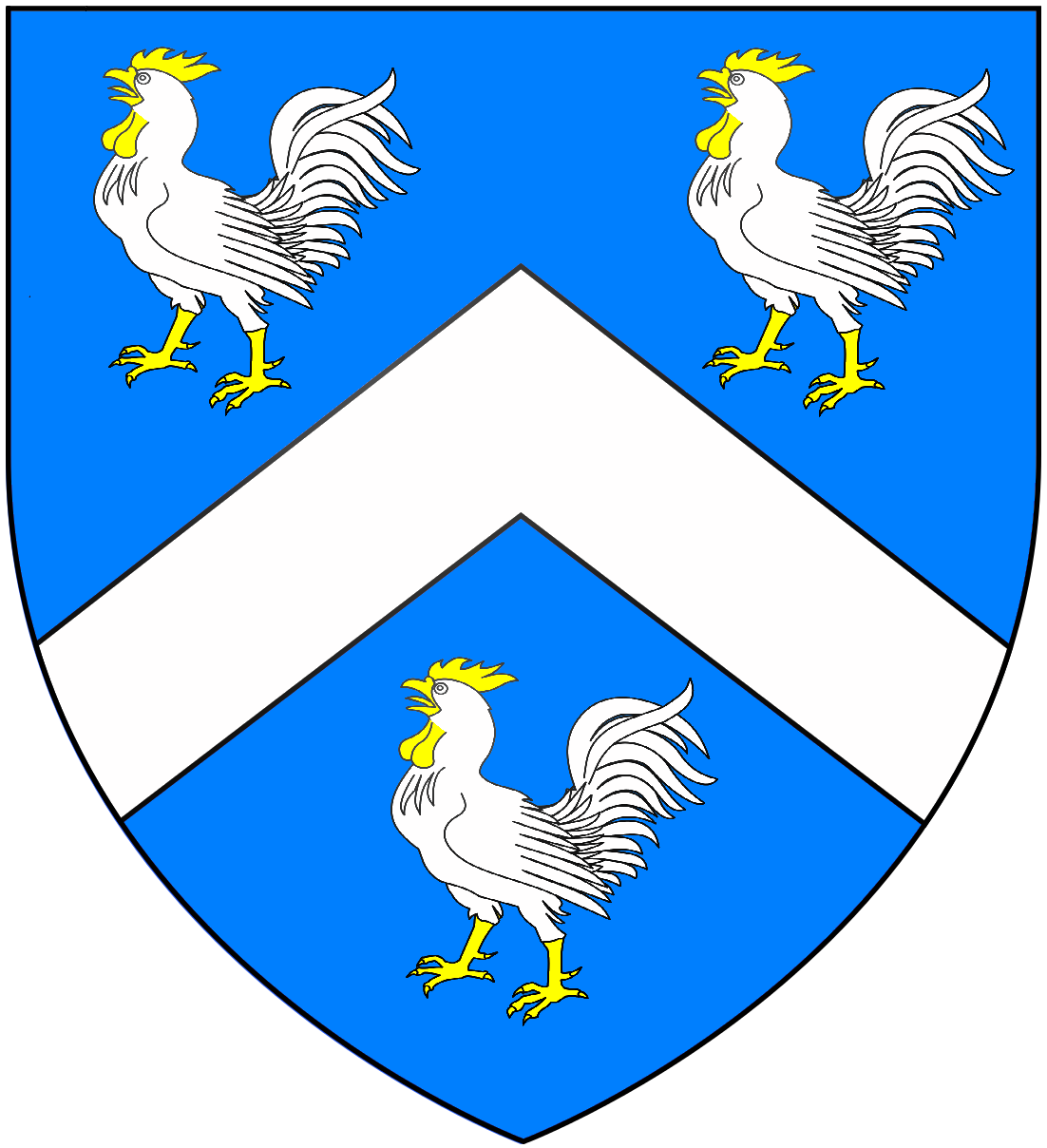
Arms of Lloyd of Dolobran, Montgomeryshire, Wales (of which family were the Lloyd Quakers, bankers and steel manufacturers of Birmingham and Baron Lloyd of Dolobran: Azure, a chevron between three cocks argent armed crested and wattled or

The descent of Dolobran was as follows:

==== David ap Llewellyn ====
David ap Llewellyn of Llwydiarth, the younger of three brothers who inherited as his share of the paternal lands the estates of Dolobran and Coedcowrid. His great-grandfather was Celynin of Llwydiarth, "Baron of Llwydiarth", who bore for arms: Sable, a he-goat passant argent attired and langued or. By his second wife Medisis Dcuddwr, daughter of Griffith Dcuddwr he had an eldest son and heir Ivan Teg.

==== Ivan Teg ====
Ivan Teg ("The Handsome"), eldest son and heir. He married Mawd Blaney, daughter of Evan Blaney (ancestor of the Lords Blaney) of Tregynon and Castle Blaney, in County Monahan, Ireland. By his wife he had a son:

==== Owen of Dolobran ====
Owen of Dolobran. In about 1476 he adopted the surname "Lloyd". This was a reference to the family's ancestral estate called "Llwydiarth". He married Catherine Vaughan, daughter of Reynault Vaughan, son of Sir Griffith Vaughan, Knight Banneret.

==== Evan Lloyd of Dolobran ====
Evan Lloyd of Dolobran, son, who married Gwenhafar lloyd, daughter of Meredith Lloyd of Meivod.

==== David Lloyd (born 1523) ====
David Lloyd (born 1523) of Dolobran, son, a Justice of the Peace, who married secondly Eva Goch, daughter of David Goch, son of Jenkin Vaughan of Bodoach.

==== David Lloyd (born 1549) ====
David Lloyd (born 1549), son, a Justice of the Peace, who married Ales Lloyd, daughter of David Lloyd of Llanarmon-Mynydd-Maur.

==== John Lloyd (1575–1636) ====
John Lloyd (1575–1636) of Dolobran, son, a Justice of the Peace for Montgomeryshire, who married his cousin Katherine Wynne, a daughter and co-heiress of Humphrey Wynne of Duffryn. He lived principally at Coedcowrid, where he wainscoted the parlours and hall, and "lived there in great state, having twenty-four men with halberts, his tenants, to attend him to Meifod Church, and placed them in his great pew, under the pulpit".

==== Charles Lloyd (born 1597) ====
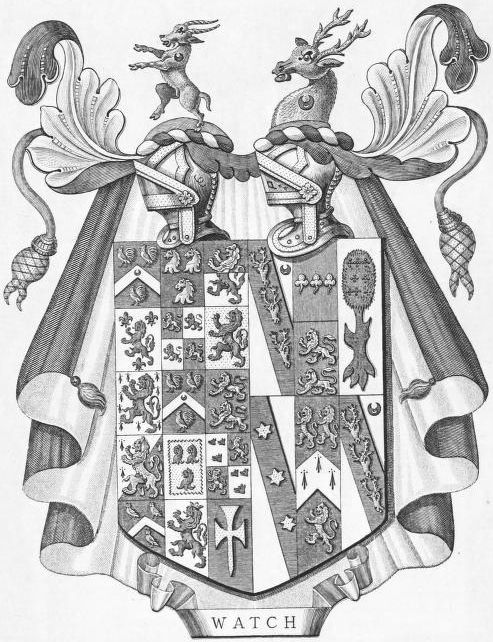
Arms of Charles Lloyd (1597-) (15 quarters) impaling Stanley (6 quarters). Engraving of an escutcheon on an oak panel formerly at Dolobran Hall. "In the glowing colour of its many quarterings (it) recalls the long ancestry of the (Lloyd) family reaching back to Welsh kings, princes and patriarchs" (Humphrey Lloyd (1975)) (The lion rampant was ubiquitous in Welsh heraldry)

Charles Lloyd (born 1597) of Dolobran, son, a Justice of the Peace, who married Elizabeth Stanley, daughter of Thomas Stanley, son of Sir Edward Stanley, grandson of Sir Foulk Stanley and great-grandson of Sir Piers Stanley, whose father Sir Rowland Stanley was brother of Lord Strange of Knockyn, of Knockyn Shropshire, of the Stanley Earl of Derby family. He lived at Dolobran, which house he enlarged by adding timber buildings to the north side, making the house "L-shaped". He was a distinguished genealogist, and it was during his occupancy that an oak panel (lost after 1780) was erected over the fireplace of the old hall displaying an heraldic escutcheon showing the arms of Lloyd (with 15 quarters) impaling Stanley (with 6 quarters). By his wife he had three sons and one daughter:

- Charles Lloyd of Dolobran, eldest son and heir (see below)
- John Lloyd (born 1638), second son, who married Jane Gresham (descended from Sir Thomas Gresham (died 1549), founder of the Royal Exchange in London), presented to the parish church of Meifod a silver-gilt flagon and paten, inscribed in Latin as follows:

Johannes Lloyd Alius natu secundus Caroli Lloyd nuper de Dolobran in Com. Montgomeriensis Armiger hanc Lagenum Ecclesiae suae Parochiali de Meifod in com. praedicto (ubi natus et baptizutus fuit) ad sacros Eucharistiae usus donat consecratque. ("John Lloyd, second-born of Charles Lloyd, late of Dolobran in the county of Montgomery, Esquire, gave and consecrated this flagon to the aforesaid church of his parish of Meifod (where he was born and baptised) for the service of the Eucharist").

- Thomas Lloyd (1640–1694), third son, who became a quaker and preacher and assisted William Penn in the establishment of the American Colony of Pennsylvania, which he served as Deputy-Governor and President from 1684 to 1693.

==== Charles Lloyd (1637–1698) ====
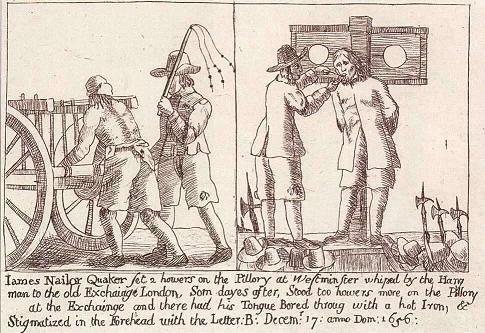
James Nayler, a prominent Quaker leader, being pilloried and whipped. Charles Lloyd (1637–1698) suffered much persecution for his Quaker faith

Charles Lloyd (1637–1698) of Dolobran, eldest son and heir, who like his two brothers was educated at Jesus College, Oxford. In about 1660 he built a "Friends's Meeting House" or Quaker chapel, at Dolobran, which survives today. In 1661 he married firstly Elizabeth Lort (1633–1685), daughter of Sampson Lort (d.pre-1670) of East Moor in Pembrokeshire, one of the three sons of Henry Lort of Stackpole Court in Pembrokeshire, Sheriff of Pembrokeshire in 1619, of whom the eldest was Sir Roger Lort, 1st Baronet (died 1664), created a baronet in 1662. A monument in the north transept of Westminster Abbey survives in memory of Sir Gilbert Lort, 3rd Baronet (c. 1670 – 1698), the last male heir of the Lort family, and a cousin of Elizabeth Lort. In 1662 he became a Quaker, having attached himself to George Fox and his followers, the founders of the Society of Friends, for which he suffered much persecution. Following the Restoration of the Monarchy in 1660 Quakers were required by the Quaker Act 1662 to take the Oath of Allegiance to King Charles II (1660–1685). As the swearing of oaths was forbidden by the Quaker religion many refused to do so, including Charles Lloyd and his wife Elizabeth Lort who were imprisoned for their refusal. King James II (1685–1689) issued a Declaration of Indulgence in 1687 and 1688 and a Toleration Act in 1689, which finally allowed for freedom of conscience and prevented persecution. Thus Quakers became tolerated. Charles had served as a Justice of the Peace and had been proposed as Sheriff of Montgomeryshire, but it appears he became disqualified from holding public office by his religion.

Several references to Charles's career as an early Quaker are recorded in the Travel Journal of Richard Davies, published as "An account of the convincement, exercises, services, and travels of that antient servant of the Lord, Richard Davies, with some relation of ancient Friends, and of the spreading of Truth in North Wales":

"The next morning we went to visit Charles Lloyd, of Dolobran, who tenderly received us, and several that were at the meeting came there that day, where we had a sweet, comfortable, refreshing time, in the presence of the Lord. The report of this meeting went through the country, some saying that most of that side of the country were turned quakers. Whereupon divers were sent for, before Edward, Lord Herbert, Baron of Cherbury, to a place where he then lived, called Llyssin, about 3 miles from Dolobran. After some discourse with them, Lord Herbert sent them to Welshpool to prison, for refusing to take the Oaths of Allegiance and Supremacy which they refused, because they could not swear at all, they being six sent together, viz., Charles Lloyd, Hugh David, Richard David, Cadwallader Edwards, Ann Lawrence, and Sarah Wilson".

His possessions were placed under praemunire, his cattle were sold and Dolobran Hall was partially destroyed. Richard Davies describes Welshpool prison to which Charles Lloyd was taken as "a dirty, nasty place... He was put into a little smoky room, and did lie upon a little straw himself for a considerable time, and at length his tender wife Elizabeth, that was of a considerable family (daughter of Sampson Lort, near Pembroke), was made willing to lie upon straw with her dear and tender husband."
Charles's brother and fellow Quaker, Thomas Lloyd, accompanied by Richard Davies, interceded with Lord Herbert and managed to have Charles released to a form of house arrest in a rented house in Welshpool, where it is probable his second son, Sampson, was born on 26 February 1664. Charles Lloyd was freed following the Declaration of Indulgence of 15 March 1672, and returned to Dolobran Hall, which he expanded into a "U-shape" by the addition of a timber-framed wing.

The Journal of the leading Quaker George Fox refers to Lloyd in 1666: "I passed into Shropshire, and from thence into Wales, and had a large general men's meeting at Charles Lloyd's, where some opposers came in; but the Lord's power brought them down". In 1680 or 1681 at Welshpool, Charles Lloyd with others including his brother Thomas, met William Lloyd, Bishop of St. Asaph, who wished to "win over the Dissenters by gentleness and argument". The discussion lasted from 2 p.m. till 2 a.m. next morning and continued for two days in the Town Hall, as a public meeting attended by the Lord Lieutenant, magistrates, and other local officials. The bishop was impressed with the civility of Lloyd and the Quakers.

In 1682 Charles Lloyd visited London with five other Quakers to complain of the sufferings of the Bristol Quakers, and met with Sir Lionel Jenkin, Secretary of State. Richard Davies, one of the party, reported that Jenkin "looked grim upon us. I left my friend, Charles Lloyd, to engage with this peevish countryman, and presented Lord Hyde with a list of men and women in prison at Bristol".

In 1698 Charles Lloyd died in Birmingham at the house of his son-in-law John Pemberton. He was buried in the burial-ground of the Society of Friends in Bull Lane, Monmouth Street, Birmingham. When the cemetery was dug up in 1851 for the building of the Great Western Railway his coffin plate was recorded as follows: " Charles Lloyd of Dolobran, in the county of Montgomeryshire, died 26th 11th month, 1698, aged 60." and also that of his second wife, Anne Lawrence of Lea in Hereford: "Ann Lloyd, died 6th month, 1708, aged 70".

By his first wife Elizabeth Lort he had one daughter (Elizabeth Lloyd, wife of John Pemberton, of Bennett's Hill, Birmingham) and two sons: the eldest one Charles Lloyd (1662–1747) of Dolobran and the younger one Sampson Lloyd (1664–1724), born in prison at Welshpool, the patriarch of the Lloyd iron-founding and banking family, who deserted the "uncharitableness of his native Wales" and moved to the town of Birmingham in Warwickshire (home of his brother-in-law John Pemberton), a town especially tolerant of Quakers and a place where due to the absence of guilds controlling trade and industry, it was easy to establish a business or factory. There he became an ironmaster and established a slitting mill at the botton of Bradford Street on the bank of the River Rea, where sheet iron was cut-up to form nails.

It was not insignificant that the two sons Charles and Samuel each married one of the daughters of Ambrose Crowley, a Quaker Blacksmith in Stourbridge, Worcestershire (near Birmingham) and Sheriff of London. The brother of the two sisters was Sir Ambrose Crowley (1658–1713), an ironmonger, whose daughter Elizabeth Crowley was the wife of John St John, 11th Baron St John of Bletso (died 1757). During the time of Sir Ambrose III's management, the Crowley Iron Works at Winlaton, Winlaton Mill, and at Swalwell, all in County Durham were probably Europe's biggest industrial complex. Sir Ambrose lent large sums to the government which appointed him a founding director of the South Sea Company.

==== Charles Lloyd (1662–1747) ====
Charles Lloyd (1662–1747) of Dolobran, eldest son, who in 1693 married Sarah Crowley, a daughter of Ambrose Crowley, a Quaker Blacksmith in Stourbridge, Worcestershire (near Birmingham) and Sheriff of London. Her brother was Sir Ambrose Crowley (1658–1713), an ironmonger, whose daughter Elizabeth Crowley was the wife of John St John, 11th Baron St John of Bletso (died 1757). During the time of Sir Ambrose III's management, the Crowley Iron Works at Winlaton, Winlaton Mill, and at Swalwell, all in County Durham were probably Europe's biggest industrial complex. Sir Ambrose lent large sums to the government which appointed him a founding director of the South Sea Company. Charles Lloyd added brick buildings onto Dolobran Hall and added "courts, and gardens, he also built the fish lodge, and made the pool thereof on his estate at Dolobran, greatly to its embellishment, and from whence the Hall itself makes a pretty figure, the more as on account of the brick part of the house being between the timber buildings, rendering the platform thereof nearly to a square."

Lloyd's Estate Act 1731
- Act of Parliament
- Parliament of Great Britain
- Long title: An Act for supplying a Defect in a Conveyance lately made by Charles Lloyd Senior and Sarah his Wife; and Charles Lloyd Junior and Jane his Wife; and for the Sale of certain Lands, in the County of Montgomery, for raising Three Thousand Pounds, and Six Hundred Pounds; and for other Purposes therein mentioned.
- Citation: 5 Geo. 2. c. 30 Pr.
- Territorial extent: Great Britain

Dates
- Royal assent: 1 June 1732
- Commencement: 13 January 1732 (Note: Start of session.)

Status: Current legislation

Charles Lloyd of Dolobran Forge is recorded as having built (or rebuilt) a furnace at Bersham Ironworks in 1717, which was converted from charcoal operation to coke fuelling in 1721. His Bersham Ironworks business is said to have folded around 1729. Coke fuelling had been used in Coalbrookdale since 1709, but only for casting, as the sulphur content of the steels generally made it unsuitable for forging. As regards the iron forge at Dolobran, (Note: Lloyd, S., 1907, p.20: "Why he was so venturesome as to commence making iron so far from a market for its produce is not recorded"; the author seems to have been unaware of the influence of his wife's family, the Crowleys, well-established iron founders, in prompting Charles Lloyd to venture himself into the industry) the office building survived at least until 1883 with a datestone "1719" over the doorway. In common with other small forges it used charcoal as a heat source, obtained from local woodland, and carted its iron product to be sold in the markets of Birmingham (about 62 miles south-east of Dolobran) and Staffordshire. The operation was not successful, having probably started when the price of iron was high and been unable to cope with falling prices. He thus encountered financial difficulties and in 1742, by now an elderly man aged 80, he left Dolobran and moved to Birmingham, where his brother-in-law John Pemberton lived. It appears that part of the Dolobran estate may have been sold by him as he obtained a private act of Parliament, Lloyd's Estate Act 1731 (5 Geo. 2. c. 30 Pr.), to remove the entail from the estate, thus making it saleable. He died in Birmingham on 21 January 1747 and was buried in the Quaker cemetery there.

==== Charles Lloyd (1697–1767) ====
Charles Lloyd (1697–1767), eldest son, of Dolobran, who in 1723 married Jane Wilkins, daughter of Richard Wilkins, of Thornbury. By his wife he had children two sons and five daughters.

==== Charles Exton Lloyd (1726–1773) ====
Charles Exton Lloyd (1726–1773), eldest son and heir, who died unmarried in France. His heir to Dolobran was his younger brother James.

==== James Lloyd (1740–1787) ====
James Lloyd (1740–1787), younger brother and heir, a wine merchant in Coventry, who died unmarried. In 1780 he sold the Dolobran estate to Joseph Jones.

=== Jones ===
Dolobran was sold by James Lloyd (1740–1787) to Joseph Jones in 1780. Jones was a Clerk of the Peace at Welshpool, probably an attorney involved in mortgaging the estate. Jones's sons died young and unmarried, and Dolobran was placed in trust for his daughter. In January 1878 her trustees sold Dolobran and the Meeting House to Sampson Samuel Lloyd. "Thus the estate was restored to the family after having been in the possession of others for nearly a century".

=== Lloyd (repurchased) ===
In the 1870s the estate was split into two parts, Dolobran Isaf and Dolobran, with each part being re-purchased by a different junior branch of the Lloyd family, both descended from Sampson Lloyd (born 1664). This separation into two estates continued until beyond 1937.

==== Dolobran Isaf ====
In 1872 and 1873 parts of the Dolobran estate known as Dolobran Fach (alias Dolobran Isaf) and also Coedcowrid (the dower house of the estate) were repurchased by one of the junior branches of the Lloyd family descended from Sampson Lloyd (born 1664), namely by Henry Lloyd (1840–1902), of Pitsford Hall in Northamptonshire (2nd son of Richard Harman Lloyd (1807–1867) of Allesley House in Warwickshire, a London banker and a grandson of Sampson III Lloyd (1728–1807) of Farm, Bordesley, Warwickshire (now in Sparkbrook, Birmingham), great-nephew of Charles Lloyd (1662–1747) of Dolobran), High Sheriff of Montgomeryshire in 1883. His granddaughter Mary Doreen Lloyd retained Dolobran Isaf until beyond 1937.

==== Dolobran ====
- Sampson Samuel Lloyd (1820–1899), MP (another descendant of Sampson Lloyd (born 1664)), in 1878 bought back the other part of the estate from the trustees of the will of Joseph Jones, one of whom was J. Buckley Williams of Berriew who requested Lloyd "to pay to my solicitors the sum of £ 18,000 being balance of purchase money due to me from him on sale of Dolobran estate, 8th January, 1878." He had purchased the nearby estate of Garth Fach in 1873. He married as his first wife Emma Reeve, the daughter of Samuel Reeve of Leighton Buzzard.
- Sampson Samuel Lloyd (1846–1899) of Dolobran, eldest son, also of The Priory and Budbrooke House, Warwickshire, was a Justice of the Peace. In 1868 he married Jane Emilia Lloyd (died 1899), daughter of Thomas Lloyd of The Priory, Warwick. His third son was the politician George Ambrose Lloyd, 1st Baron Lloyd (1879–1941), created in 1925 Baron Lloyd of Dolobran in the County of Montgomery which barony expired on the death of his son Alexander Lloyd, 2nd Baron Lloyd (1912–1985) without surviving male children.
- Thomas Owen Lloyd (born 1873) of Dolobran and of The Priory, Warwick, 2nd but eldest surviving son, High Sheriff of Warwickshire in 1915, who in 1898 married Elsie Adams, daughter of Rev. John Adams, vicar of Offchurch in Warwickshire.
- Sampson Llewellyn Lloyd (born 1907), eldest son and heir, who married Margaret Parker, a daughter of Charles Sandbach Parker of Fairlie House, Ayrshire. He was still living at Dolobran in 1969.
- Charles David Sampson Lloyd (b.1931), eldest son.
