= Slitting mill =

Watermill for cutting rods of iron into bars

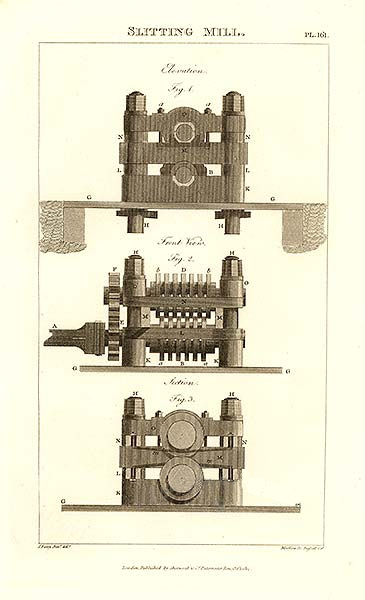
Slitting mill, 1813

The slitting mill was a watermill for slitting bars of iron into rods. The rods were then passed to nailers who made the rods into nails, by giving them a point and head.

The slitting mill was probably invented near Liège in what is now Belgium. The first slitting mill in England was built at Dartford, Kent in 1590. This was followed by one near Rugeley at the once separate village which was called Stonehouse, but is now called Slitting Mill, by about 1611, and then Hyde Mill in Kinver in 1627. Others followed in various parts of England where iron was made. However, there was a particular concentration of them on the River Stour between Stourbridge and Stourport, where they were conveniently placed to slit iron that was brought up (or down) the River Severn before it reached nailers in the Black Country.

The slitting mill consisted of two pairs of rollers turned by water wheels. Mill bars were flat bars of iron about three inches (75 mm) wide and half an inch (13 mm) thick. A piece was cut off the end of the bar with shears powered by one of the water wheels and heated in a furnace. This was then passed between flat rollers which made it into a thick plate. It was then passed through the second rollers (known as cutters), which slit it into rods. The cutters had intersecting grooves which sheared the iron lengthways.

== Fiddler Foley's espionage ==
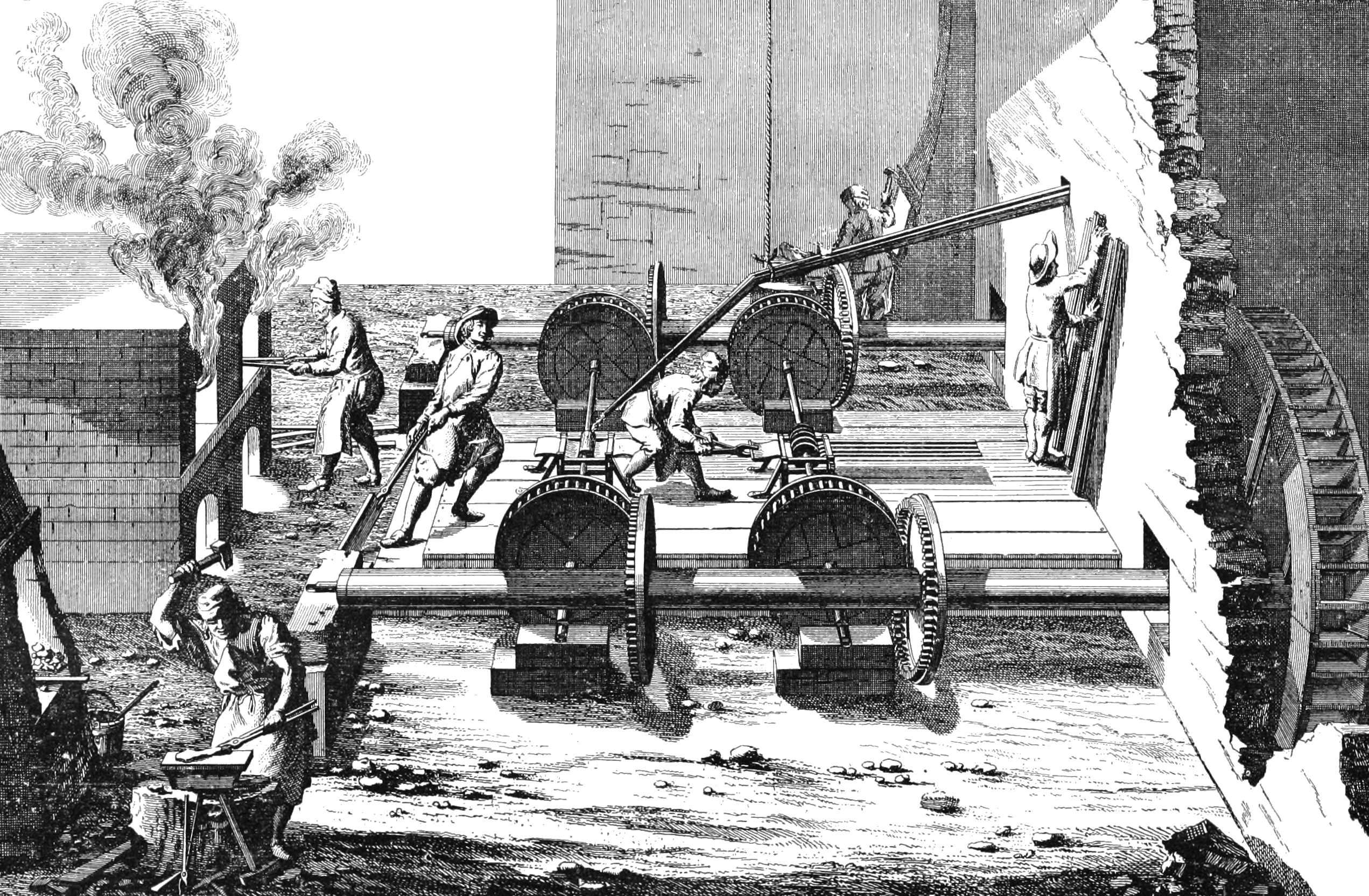
Swedish slitting mill in 1734.

The technology is said to have been brought from Sweden by the industrial espionage of Richard Foley (1580-1657) ("Fiddler Foley") of Stourbridge, a Puritan and ancestor of Baron Foley. The story is related as follows by Samuel III Lloyd (1827-1918) of Farm, in his 1907 family history The Lloyds of Birmingham with some Account of the Founding of Lloyd's Bank:

"It was early in the seventeenth century when the neighbourhood of Stourbridge was the centre of the nail-making industry of England that Sweden became a discomforting competitor to those engaged in this industry; as nails made there were sold in England at prices with which Stourbridge makers could not compete. This caused young Foley of Stourbridge to resolve to find out, if possible, how their underselling was accomplished. He accordingly started for Sweden, but with so little money that it was exhausted on his arrival there, and he was left (not unlike Oliver Goldsmith in his travels in Holland) with the solitary but somewhat lively resource of a fiddle. He was, however, an excellent musician, as well as a pleasant fellow, and he successfully begged and fiddled his way to the celebrated Dannemora Mines, near Uppsala. He readily ingratiated himself with the iron-workers; and, having for some time carefully observed their machinery, he believed he had found out their methods. He therefore returned to Stourbridge, full of hope that he had acquired the secret of the construction of a slitting-mill, by means of which plates of wrought iron could be slit into nail-rods. So strongly persuaded was he of success that a gentleman was induced to advance the requisite money; but, alas! to the great disappointment of all concerned, the machinery failed to slit the iron. Foley therefore set out for Sweden a second time, receiving on his arrival a joyful welcome from the Swedish workmen. So gladly indeed did they receive the returned fiddler, that, with a disastrous confidence, to make sure of him they lodged him in the very citadel of the business, the slitting-mill itself, looking on him, in their simple-minded, uncommercial good-fellowship, as a mere fiddler, and nothing more. He remained long enough to ascertain where his mistakes lay, and then again disappeared. On his return to Stourbridge he succeeded in having machinery constructed that perfectly performed the work required. Thereafter he not only supplied the nail-makers with the nail-rods they wanted, but also made a fortune in doing it. It is pleasant and gratifying to record that while amassing wealth himself, he was not unmindful of the needs of others; for he invariably and generously aided all the plans of benevolence set on foot in his neighbourhood".

How far this legend reflects what actually happened is doubtful. The earliest version of the story to name Foley is that of William Playfair in 1809, which takes him to Holland. However the earliest version was published by Stebbing Shaw, quoting the manuscript history of Richard Wilkes of Willenhall,

About a mile above [Kinver] is a place called the Hide ... Here was the first mill for rolling and slitting iron that was erected in England. One Brindley, whose posterity enjoyed it till about 20 years ago, went into Germany, there he acted the fool, and from thence brought back this excellent machine which has been so serviceable and has brought so much money into this country.

Richard Foley was already a substantial entrepreneur in 1627 when he leased Hyde Mill for conversion to a slitting mill, and leased Himley Furnace from Lord Dudley in 1625. The application of the story to Foley is thus not credible, but it could refer to his brother-in-law George Brynley, who ran the mill for Foley. His son Richard bought Hyde Mill and Farm in 1647, and it descended in the family until John Brindley became bankrupt in 1730.

== Description of Lloyd's mills ==
In a map of Birmingham dated 1731, 7 years after the death of Sampson I Lloyd (1664-1724), Lloyd's slitting and corn mills are shown with access from Digbeth by Lower Mill Lane. A later map dated 1751 shows the slitting-mill with a mill pool and a large garden. A description of the slitting mill survives in a letter dated 31 July 1755 written by visitors from London to the Pembertons, Lloyd cousins:

Next Morning (Monday) [July 1755] we went to see Mr. L 's Slitting Mill, which is too curious to pass by without notice. Its use is to prepare iron for making nails. The process is as follows: they take a large iron bar, and with a huge pair of shears, work'd by a water-wheel, cut it into lengths of about a foot each; these pieces are put into a furnace, and heated red-hot, then taken out and put between a couple of steel rollers, which draw them to the length of about four feet, and the breadth of about three inches; thence they are immediately put between two other rollers, which having a number of sharp edges fitting each other like scissors, cut the bar as it passes thro' into about eight square rods; after the rods are cold, they are tied up in bundles for the nailor's use. We din'd and spent the evening (after walking again to Dudson) at Mr. Lloyd's.

== Bibliography ==
- Schubert, H. R. (1957). History of the British Iron and Steel Industry from c.450 BC to 1775 AD. London: Routledge. pp. 304–312.
- King, P. W. (1999). "The Development of the Iron Industry in South Staffordshire in the 17th century: history and myth". Trans. Staffs. Arch. & Hist. Soc. XXXVIII: 62–64. "outline, drawn from a number of documentary sources, of the development of the charcoal iron industry in the west Midlands between the magnates of the Elizabethan period and the professional ironmasters of the late-seventeenth and eighteenth centuries. The author argues that the period was one of organisational change rather than technological development, such as the amalgamation of ironworks so as to control the charcoal supply in a district, and that firms were fewer in number and operating on a larger scale much earlier than was hitherto suspected."
- Gale, W. K. V. (1966). The Black Country Iron Industry: a technical history. London: Iron and Steel Institute. pp. 14–15.
- Lloyd, Samuel (1907). The Lloyds of Birmingham with some Account of the Founding of Lloyd's Bank (2nd ed.). Birmingham & London.
- Cooksley, M. V. (1981). "Hyde Mill". West Midlands Studies. 14: 44–49.
- Playfair, W. (1813). British family Antiquities. Vol. I.
- Shaw, S. Shaw (1801). "p. 265". History and Antiquities of Staffordshire. ii (1).
- Fernihough, T. 'Original collection for the History of Staffordshire by Richard Wilkes M.D.' William Salt Library. Stafford: Salt MSS.
