= Macliver =

Macliver is a surname. Notable people with the surname include:

- Peter Stewart Macliver (1822–1891), Scottish journalist and politician
- Sara Macliver (1969), Australian opera singer
