= Thomas Lloyd (lieutenant governor) =

Lieutenant governor of Pennsylvania (1640–1694)

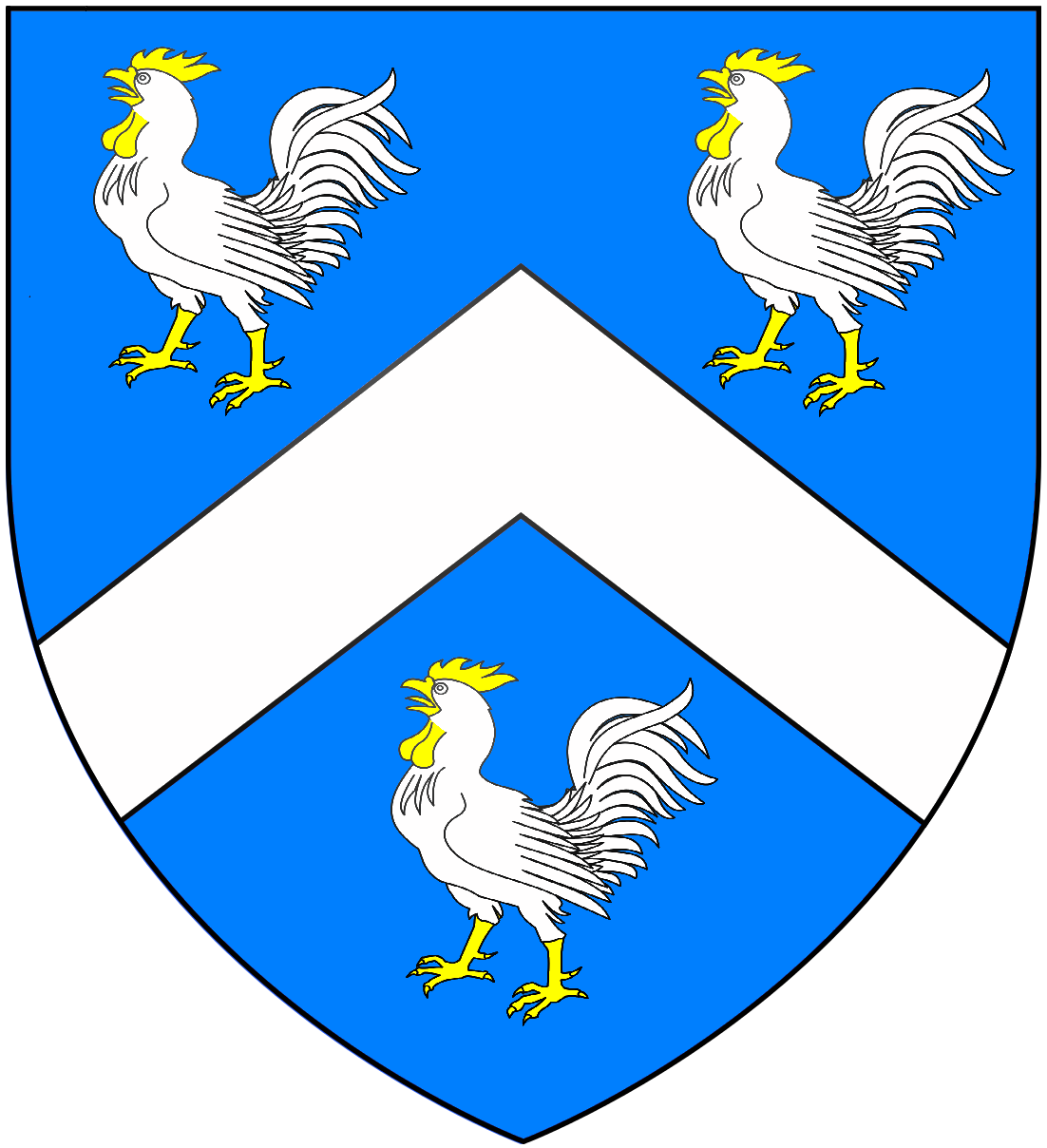
Arms of Lloyd of Dolobran, Montgomeryshire, Wales (of which family were the Lloyd Quakers, bankers (Lloyds Bank) and steel manufacturers of Birmingham and Baron Lloyd of Dolobran: Azure, a chevron between three cocks argent armed crested and wattled or

Thomas Lloyd (6 April 1640 – 10 September 1694) was a lieutenant-governor of the Province of Pennsylvania and a Quaker preacher.

== Early life ==
He was the third son of Charles I Lloyd (1613–1657) of Dolobran, in the parish of Meifod, Montgomeryshire in Wales, by his wife Elizabeth Stanley, a member of a junior line of the Stanley family, Earls of Derby.

== Career ==
He was educated at Ruthin School. He studied law and medicine at Jesus College, Oxford, from which he was graduated in 1661. He became a Quaker, and in 1664 was arrested and imprisoned in Welshpool until the Royal Declaration of Indulgence in 1672.

He became a physician and enjoyed a large practice; but in 1683 he and his family removed to Pennsylvania due to continued religious persecution with William Penn, who made him master of the rolls. He was chosen to represent Philadelphia County in the provincial council in January 1684, and as its president administered the government, after Penn sailed for England in August, till 9 December 1687, when he was one of an executive commission of five that held power for ten months.

He was again elected to the council to represent Bucks County in 1689, and took his seat in spite of the opposition of the governor, John Blackwell, with whom he and others of the Quaker party had a controversy. Blackwell was removed from office by Penn, and Lloyd was again chosen president of the council and afterward commissioned lieutenant-governor by Penn, holding office from 1690 to 1693. During his administration the schism headed by George Keith took place.

Two of his Quaker pamphlets were later published: "An epistle to my Dear and well beloved Friends of Dolobran" in 1788 and "A Letter to John Eccles and Wife" in 1805.

== Personal life ==
He married twice, firstly to Mary Jones (died 1680), daughter of Col. Roger Jones of Welshpool, Governor of Dublin during the reign of King James II, who defeated the Marquess of Ormond in Ireland. Secondly he married Patience Storey, without issue.

He may have been the cousin of David Lloyd, the judge and politician in the Province of Pennsylvania.

He died in Pennsylvania on 10 September 1694.
