= John David Jenkins =

John David Jenkins (30 January 1828 – 9 November 1876) was a Welsh clergyman and historian. He spent six years ministering in Pietermaritzburg; after his return to England, he became known as the "Rail men's Apostle" for his work with railway workers in Oxford. He was Vice-President, and then President, of the Amalgamated Society of Railway Servants. He also wrote a book on the history of the church.

== Life ==
Jenkins was born in Merthyr Tydfil, Glamorgan on 30 January 1828. His father, William David Jenkins, could allegedly trace his ancestry back to Iestyn ap Gwrgant, the last Prince of Morgannwg. After attending Taliesin Williams's school in Merthyr Tydfil and Cowbridge Grammar School, Jenkins studied at Oxford University, matriculating at Jesus College in 1846 with the benefit of the Sir Leoline Jenkins scholarship. He studied Literae Humaniores, obtaining a third-class BA degree in 1850. He subsequently obtained further degrees: M.A. in 1852, BD in 1859 and DD in 1871. He became a good classical and oriental scholar whilst at Oxford, developing a fluency in modern languages in later life. Whilst an undergraduate, he tried and failed on several occasions for the Pusey and Ellerton Hebrew Scholarship; after his final failure, Dr Pusey presented him with some books to acknowledge his abilities in Hebrew.

Jenkin's rich personal library was presented to Llandaff Cathedral, where it remained in the Prebendal House for over a century until the recent dispersal of the cathedral library to provide funds for a refurbished organ.

He was appointed as a Fellow of Jesus College in 1851/2, retaining this position until his death. The fellowship was a King James II Missionary Fellowship, under the terms of which Jenkins was required to become ordained and "proceed to such one of Her Majesty's plantations as the Bishop of London, for the time being, might appoint." He was ordained deacon in 1851 by Samuel Wilberforce, Bishop of Oxford, and appointed curate to the Reverend Alfred Hackman at St Paul's Church, Oxford. St Paul's was a noted Tractarian church. Whilst Jenkins was at St Paul's, Thomas Combe commissioned Holman Hunt to paint Jenkins's portrait.

In accordance with the terms of the fellowship, Jenkins went to the Cape of Good Hope, arriving in November 1852. Bishop Robert Gray, the bishop of Cape Town, sent him to Pietermaritzburg under the direction of the rector, the Reverend James Green. Jenkins remained in Pietermaritzburg for six years, working particularly with the armed forces as Chaplain to the 45th Regiment and Battery of Field Artillery. He soon became involved in controversy when Green, Jenkins and others opposed Bishop John Colenso, the first Bishop of Natal, who had questioned the literal accuracy of some biblical passages based on his own mathematical calculations, and had also condemned ritualistic practices (particularly the wearing of "gorgeous coloured vestments") favoured by the Tractarians. Bishop Gray attempted to relieve Bishop Colenso of his position at a court hearing in which he sat in judgment. Colenso, however, refused to attend at the hearing and subsequently succeeded in his application to the Privy Council for an order that the Bishop Gray's judgment had been illegal. Following the Privy Council judgment Colenso returned to Natal.

Bishop Colenso made Jenkins a canon of Pietermaritzburg in 1856. Ill-health (the early stages of liver cancer) caused Jenkins to leave South Africa in 1858 and return to Oxford. He became Dean of Jesus College in 1865, and Junior Bursar in 1866. Jenkins then wrote a book on the history of the Christian Church. The Age of the Martyrs, the first volume of the work, was published in 1869 and was dedicated by Jenkins to Green. It was translated into Welsh in 1890. The rest of the book was not published. In March 1870, Jenkins was appointed vicar of Aberdare, Glamorgan, by the Marquess of Bute. He died of liver cancer in Aberdare on 9 November 1876.

== Ministry ==
Jenkins's "abiding compassion for the less fortunate", as it has been termed, was first demonstrated with his work with the army in South Africa, where one of his contemporaries said that "his influence for good was boundless". After his return to Oxford, he became involved with the Society of the Holy Cross, an Anglo-Catholic clerical organisation founded by Pusey and others. Its principles included missionary work amongst the poor. Jenkins spent considerable amounts of time in the 1860s ministering to sick and poor railway workers and their families. He was a clerical superior in the "Railway Guild of the Holy Cross", which promoted Christian faith amongst railway employees. His commitment to the task of ministering to railway families led to him becoming known as the "Rail men's Apostle".

After his appointment to Aberdare, a town where Dissenters were strong, Jenkins organised choral services with psalms being sung to Anglican chants and the canticles to Gregorian chants. He worked with Nonconformists to promote local friendly societies and was sufficiently well-regarded to be presented in 1874 with a testimonial noting "his genial and affectionate regard for the hardworking and humbler classes of society" and his involvement with the South Wales Choral Union, which had won a national competition at The Crystal Palace in 1872. He also represented the views of miners during strikes, sometimes clashing with employers as a result.

His involvement with railway matters did not cease on his appointment to Aberdare. When the Amalgamated Society of Railway Servants was established in 1872, he was appointed Vice-President. He helped form an Aberdare branch, and addressed meetings at local and national level, stressing the need for unity amongst the workers and the importance of providing for sickness and old-age whilst in good health. In 1873, Jenkins was unanimously elected President and held the position until his death in 1876. The ASRS paid for a memorial window at St Elven's Church, Aberdare, in his honour. At his funeral, conducted by his college friend Griffith Arthur Jones, the union's general secretary, Fred Evans, said:

The latter part of his life has been a Chapter of kindly acts and personal sacrifices for the happiness of the working classes, and more especially the railway servants and Welsh miners, who had long learned to reverence the good man and look to him for kindly counsel and assistance.

Jenkins also played a conciliatory role in the mining disputes which became increasingly prevalent in the Aberdare Valley during the 1870s. At a meeting in early 1872, addressed by miners' leaders Alexander Macdonald and Thomas Halliday, he was called to the platform by the chairman of the meeting, Henry Thomas, to great cheering.

== Portrait ==
The portrait of Jenkins by Holman Hunt from 1852 commissioned by Thomas Combe, entitled New College Cloisters, now hangs in the Senior Common Room at Jesus College. The robes worn by Jenkins are those of a High Church priest, including black silk worn over the surplice (a revival of a pre-Reformation tradition). The setting, the cloisters of New College, Oxford, has been said to give "monastic undertones" to the picture, with the overall effect that "suggested a Gothic feel wholly in keeping with contemporary Tractarian philosophy" – Hunt and Jenkins both being supporters of the Oxford Movement.

Trade union offices
Preceded by J. Baxter Langley	President of the Amalgamated Society of Railway Servants; 1874 – 1877	Succeeded by Peter Stewart Macliver
