= Gyrn Castle =

Castellated mansion in Flintshire, Wales

Coordinates: 53°19′22″N 3°19′48″W

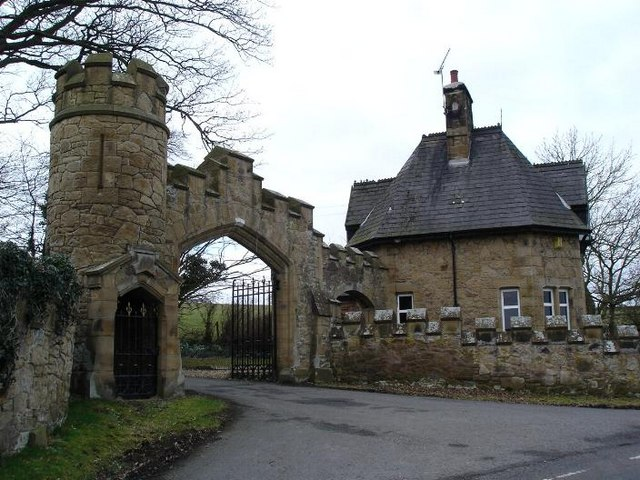
Gyrn Castle gatehouse

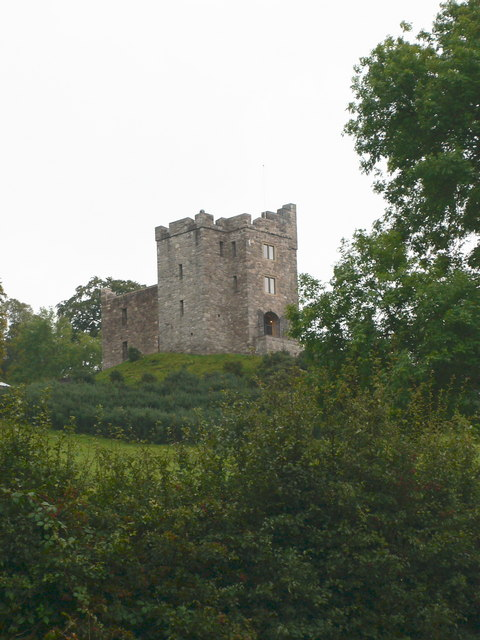
The Western ruined side

Gyrn Castle is a Grade II-listed crenellated mansion in Llanasa in Flintshire.

== History ==
It was built between 1817 and 1824 by John Douglas, who incorporated parts of a previous house on the Gyrn estate, dating to the late 17th century, on a site overlooking the Dee estuary.

The estate of Gyrn belonged in the early 17th century to the Mostyns of Cilcain. In 1749 ownership passed to the Reverend Samuel Edwards of Pentre Hall by his marriage to Charlotte Mostyn. The estate was sold in 1750, and passed by inheritance through three owners until its sale in 1817 to John Douglas, a cotton manufacturer. Douglas remodelled the house in 1817–24, probably by adding a third storey, expanding the floorplan with the addition of the projecting dining room at the north end and a picture gallery and tower at the south end. The Douglas family sold Gyrn in 1853 to Edward Bates of Hampshire, a ship owner and politician. He did little to alter the house, but did add numerous outbuildings. The mansion was listed on 17 February 1983 "as a C19 country house notable for its castellated style typical of the C19 Picturesque movement, the result of remodelling an earlier house on the site".

Gyrn Castle remained in the ownership of the Bates family until 2008, when it was bought by a member of the related Howard family. In 2025 it was put up for sale on the open market. The 2,000-acre (810-hectare) grounds include two fishing lakes and facilities for shooting game and are also listed for their historic interest as a Picturesque landscape. The house itself is hired out for wedding receptions and filming.

== The grounds ==
Gyrn Castle was listed by Cadw principally because of the grounds, described as a "Nineteenth-century picturesque layout centred on a series of lakes with a circuit walk". There are five lakes, made from the widening of the Afon-y-garth stream during Douglas' re-modelling of the house. Four smaller lakes flank a central lake with two islands. The area surrounding the lakes is wooded, mainly with beech and horse chestnut, and the banks are planted with rhododendrons. The circuit walk is an unpaved path through the woods.

The grounds and gardens are listed as Grade II in the Cadw/ICOMOS Register of Parks and Gardens of Special Historic Interest in Wales.
