= Baron Lloyd =

Extinct barony in the Peerage of the United Kingdom

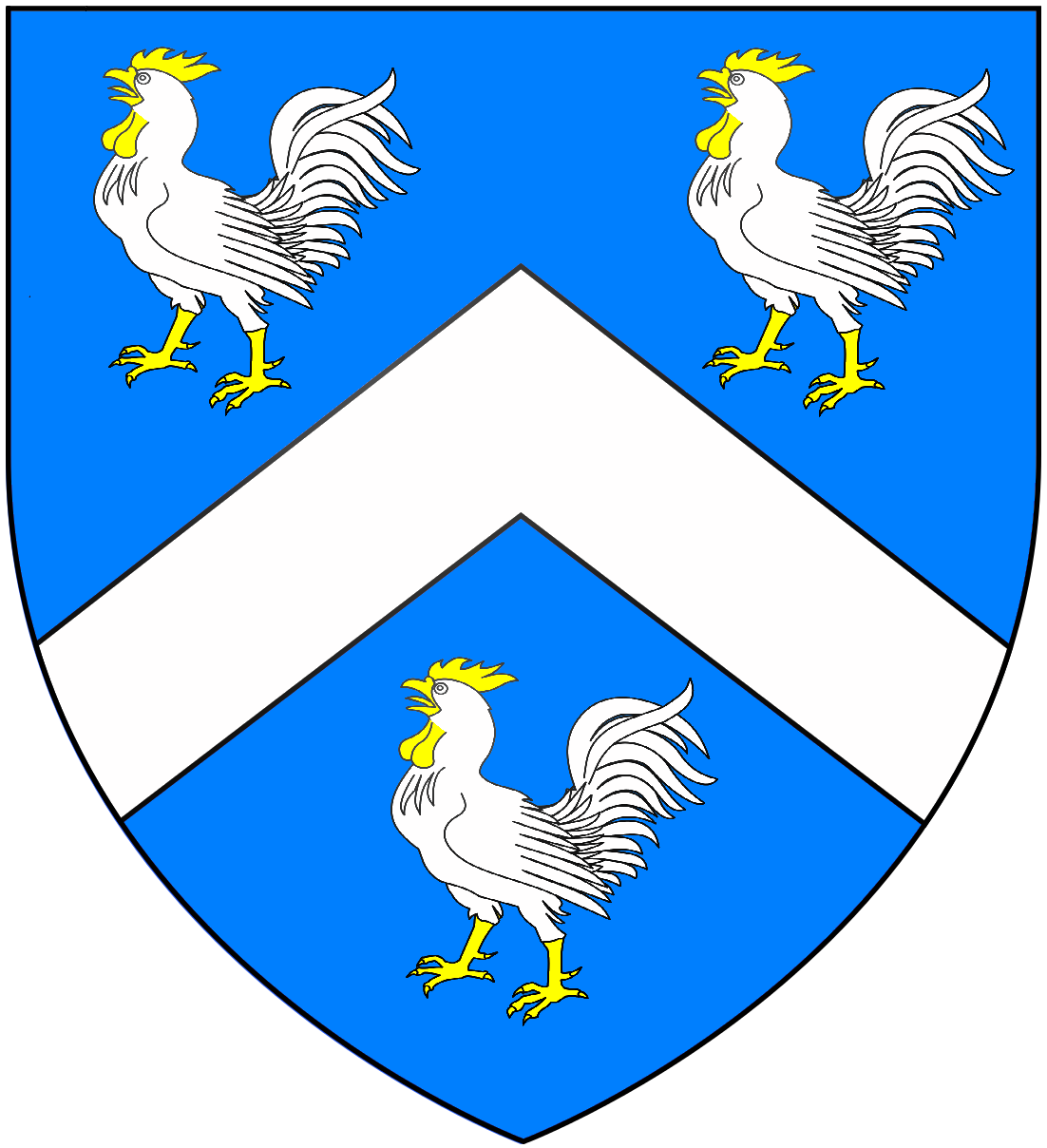
Arms of Lloyd of Dolobran, Montgomery, Wales (of which family were the Lloyd Quakers, bankers and steel manufacturers of Birmingham: Azure, a chevron between three cocks argent armed crested and wattled or

Baron Lloyd, of Dolobran in the County of Montgomery, was a title in the Peerage of the United Kingdom. It was created in 1925 for the Conservative politician Sir George Lloyd. He was succeeded by his only son, the second Baron. He was also a Conservative politician. He had no surviving male issue and on his death in 1985 the barony became extinct.

Sampson Samuel Lloyd, grandfather of the first Baron, was Member of Parliament for Plymouth and Warwickshire South.

== Barons Lloyd (1925) ==
- George Ambrose Lloyd, 1st Baron Lloyd (1879–1941)
- Alexander David Frederick Lloyd, 2nd Baron Lloyd (1912–1985)

== See also ==
- Anthony Lloyd, Baron Lloyd of Berwick
- Lloyd family (Birmingham)
