= Slitting Mill =

Village in Staffordshire, England

Coordinates: 52.754448°N 1.957731°W

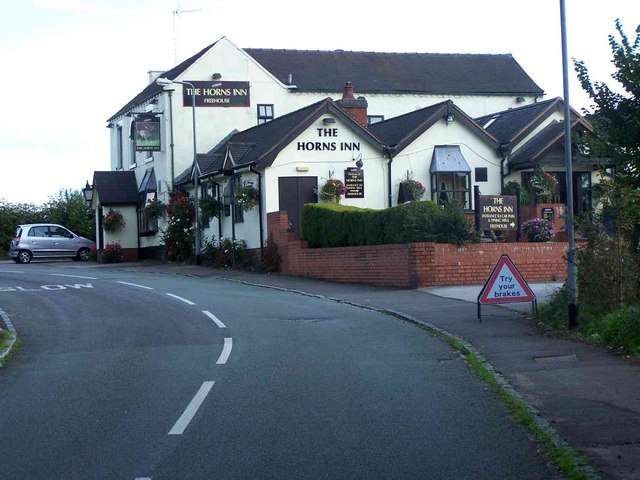
The Horns Inn, Slitting Mill

Slitting Mill is a small village on the outskirts of Rugeley, Staffordshire. At the 2001 census, it had a population of 265.

The village is within Rugeley civil parish, although it is a short distance from the rest of the town and has a distinct identity. Horns Pool is a popular local location for anglers.

The village was known as Stonehouse, but towards the end of the 19th century its name was changed to Slitting Mill after the mills sited there during the 17th and 18th centuries. The slitting mills specialised in the production of nails.

The Horns public house and St John the Baptist, Church of England are in the village.

A water pumping station, owned by South Staffordshire Water, draws water from the ground beneath the village.
