= Sir Edward Bates, 1st Baronet =

British politician (1814–1896)

Sir Edward Bates Bt
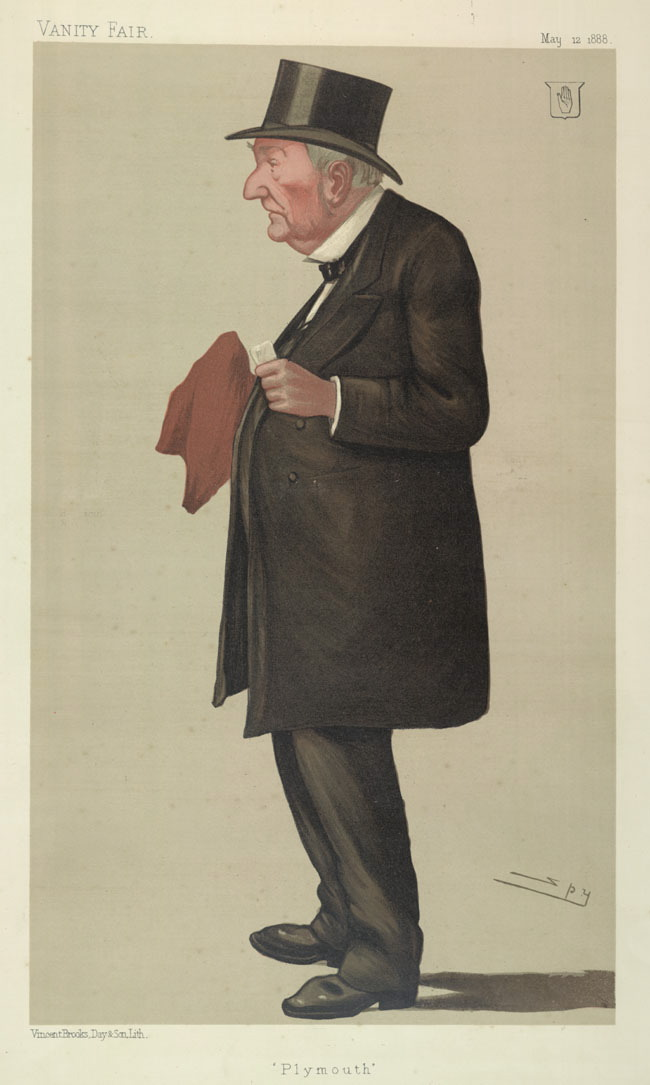
- "Plymouth". Caricature by Spy published in Vanity Fair in 1888

Member of Parliament for Plymouth
- In office 1871–1880

Personal details
- Born: 17 March 1816
- Died: 17 October 1896 (age 80)

Sir Edward Bates, 1st Baronet DL (17 March 1816 – 17 October 1896) was a ship-owner and Conservative politician who represented Plymouth.

== Biography ==
Bates was the son of Joseph Bates, a wool finisher and exporter and his wife Rebekah Walker. He was sent to Calcutta in 1833 to join his elder brother in the business which his father had started since the ending of the East India Company monopoly. He made two short trips to England in 1838–39 and in 1843, but otherwise remained in India at Calcutta and Bombay until 1848. Back in England, Bates began his own business chartering ships for the Bombay trade. He then started to buy ships, acquiring the newly built Jamsetjee Cursetjee, named after his Parsee partner in Bombay. He had built a fleet of 60 ships in 1860 and eventually owned 130 ships.

Bates became Conservative Member of Parliament for Plymouth in 1871 and held the seat until 1880 when, on 25 June 1880, he was unseated on the grounds of illegal payments by his agents. He regained the seat in 1885, holding it until 1892. He was deputy lieutenant of Hampshire and Lancashire and a J.P. for Lancashire. He was created 1st Baronet Bates, of Bellefield, co. Lancaster on 13 May 1880. He lived at Bellefield, West Derby, Liverpool, Lancashire, Manydown Park, Hampshire, and Gyrn Castle, Llanasa, Flintshire, Wales.

Bates first wife was Charlotte Elizabeth Umfreville-Smith, daughter of Cornelius Umfreville-Smith, whom he married in 1837. He married, secondly, Ellen Thompson, daughter of Thomas Thompson, on 25 June 1844. He had three daughters with his first wife.

Parliament of the United Kingdom
Preceded by Sir Robert Collier and Walter Morrison	Member of Parliament for Plymouth; 1871–1880; With: Walter Morrison, to 1874; Sampson Lloyd 1874–1880; Peter Macliver 1880	Succeeded by Peter Macliver and Sir Edward Clarke
Preceded by Peter Macliver and Sir Edward Clarke	Member of Parliament for Plymouth; 1885–1892; With: Sir Edward Clarke	Succeeded by Sir Edward Clarke and Charles Harrison
Baronetage of the United Kingdom
New creation	Baronet (of Bellefield); 1880–1896	Succeeded by Edward Percy Bates
