= Alexander Lloyd, 2nd Baron Lloyd =

British Conservative politician

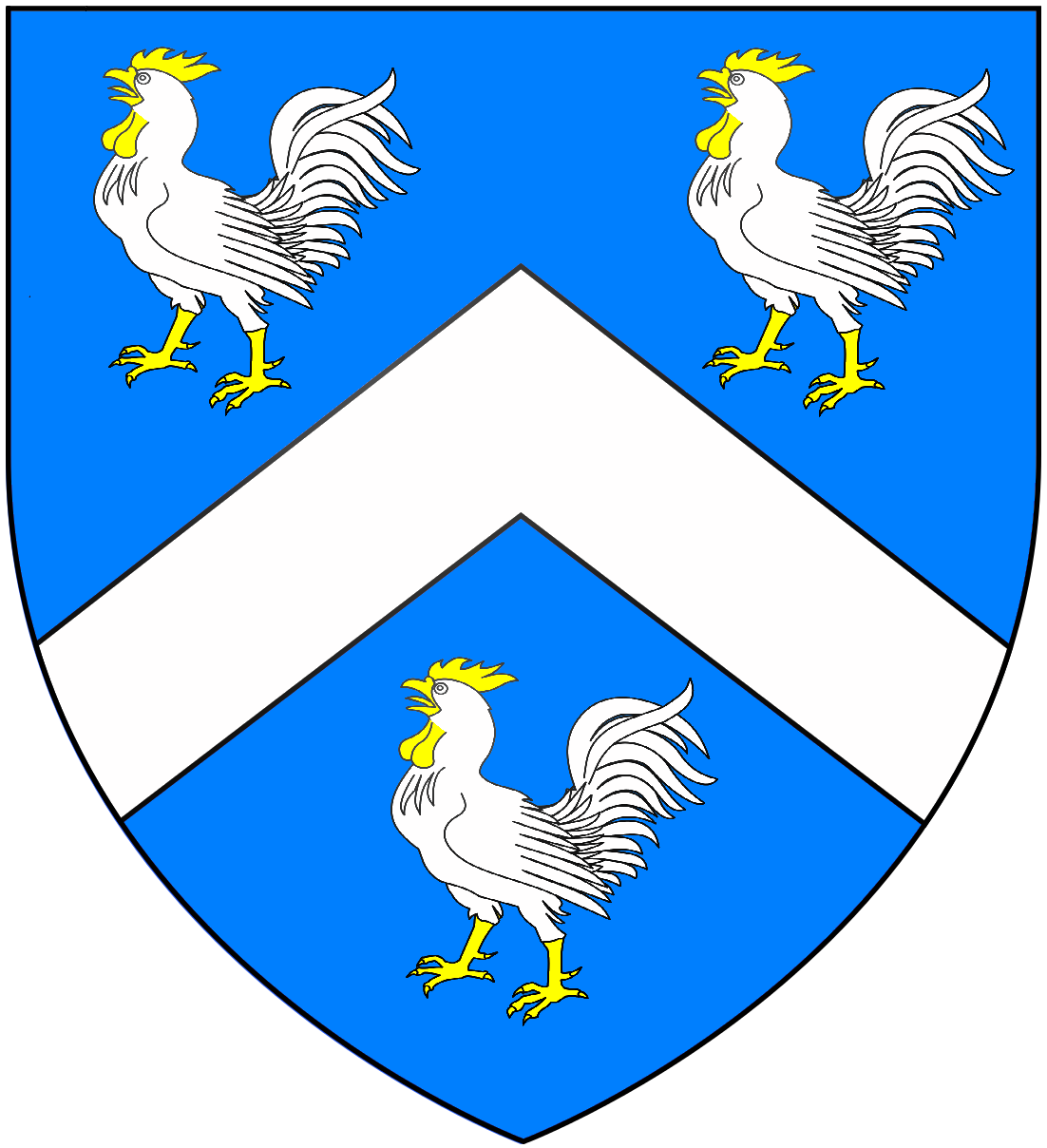
Arms of Lloyd of Dolobran, Montgomeryshire, Wales (of which family were the Lloyd Quakers, bankers and steel manufacturers of Birmingham: Azure, a chevron between three cocks argent armed crested and wattled or

Alexander David Frederick Lloyd, 2nd Baron Lloyd MBE (30 September 1912 – 5 November 1985), was a British Conservative politician.

Lloyd was the only son of George Lloyd, 1st Baron Lloyd, and his wife, Blanche Isabella (née Lascelles). He was educated at Eton College and Trinity College, Cambridge. He was commissioned in the Territorial Army as a second lieutenant in the Warwickshire Yeomanry in 1935, rising to captain in 1941. He served in the Second World War and was appointed an MBE in 1945.

He succeeded his father in the barony in 1941 and took his seat on the Conservative benches in the House of Lords. He served under Winston Churchill (a close political associate of his father) as a Lord-in-waiting (government whip in the House of Lords) from 1951 to 1952 and as Under-Secretary of State for the Home Department from 1952 to 1954, and under Churchill and later Sir Anthony Eden as Under-Secretary of State for the Colonies from 1954 to 1957. He was a Deputy Lieutenant of the county of Hertfordshire.

Lord Lloyd was in business, serving as president of the Commonwealth and British Empire Chambers of Commerce in 1957, a director of Lloyds Bank and of Beehive Insurance, and chairman of the London board of the National Bank of New Zealand in 1978.

Lord Lloyd married Lady Victoria Jean Marjorie Mabell Ogilvy (1918-2004), daughter of David Ogilvy, 12th Earl of Airlie, in 1942. They had one son and two daughters:

- The Hon. Davinia Margaret Lloyd (b. 13 March 1943)
- The Hon. Charles George David Lloyd (4 April 1949 – 1974)
- The Hon. Laura Blanche Bridget Lloyd (b. 7 March 1960)

Lord Lloyd lived at the Clouds Hill Estate, Little Offley, Hitchin. In 1950 Lord Lloyd commissioned Philip Tilden to design major alterations to the main house, these were completed two years later.

Lord Lloyd died in November 1985, aged 73. As his only son had predeceased him, the barony became extinct upon his death.

== Notes ==
Political offices
Preceded by David Llewellyn; Sir Hugh Lucas-Tooth	Under-Secretary of State for the Home Department with Sir Hugh Lucas-Tooth; 1952–1954	Succeeded by Sir Hugh Lucas-Tooth; The Lord Mancroft
Preceded by The Earl of Munster	Under-Secretary of State for the Colonies; 1954–1957	Succeeded by John Profumo
Peerage of the United Kingdom
Preceded by George Ambrose Lloyd	Baron Lloyd; 1941–1985	Extinct
