= Bertram Lloyd =

English social reformer and naturalist (1881–1944)

Bertram Lloyd FLS FRES
- Lloyd, from an obituary
- Born: Ernest Bertram Lloyd; 14 May 1881; Finsbury Park, Middlesex, England
- Died: 9 June 1944 (aged 63); Champneys, near Tring, England
- Education: Merchant Taylors' School
- Occupations: Social reformer; naturalist; editor; translator
- Spouse: Sylvia Colenso (m. 1938)
- Family: Lloyd family

Ernest Bertram Lloyd FLS FRES (14 May 1881 – 9 June 1944) was an English social reformer, naturalist, editor, and translator. A member of the Lloyd banking family, he worked in campaigns concerned with animal welfare and animal rights, pacifism, women's suffrage, sexual education, and LGBTQ+ rights. Lloyd co-founded the National Society for the Abolition of Cruel Sports and was active in the Humanitarian League and the British Society for the Study of Sex Psychology.

During the First World War, Lloyd was a conscientious objector and was involved with the Union of Democratic Control, the No-Conscription Fellowship, and the Independent Labour Party. He edited humanitarian and anti-war poetry anthologies, translated German poetry and drama, and wrote on ornithology and entomology.

== Biography ==
=== Early life and education ===
Lloyd was born Ernest Bertram Lloyd in Finsbury Park, Middlesex, on 14 May 1881, to Charles E. Lloyd, an insurance broker, and Lucy E. Lloyd. He was a member of the Lloyd banking family.

Lloyd was educated at Merchant Taylors' School, leaving in 1897. He spent two years in Germany and became fluent in German. He later translated German poetry and drama into English. After returning to London, he worked for some years in his family's business.

=== Social reform ===
==== Humanitarianism ====
As a young socialist, Lloyd lived and worked at Toynbee Hall, where he taught English literature.

Lloyd was a member of the Humanitarian League and a close associate of its founder Henry S. Salt. Salt dedicated The Call of the Wildflower to "My Friends W. J. Jupp and E. Bertram Lloyd". Lloyd edited The Great Kinship: An Anthology of Humanitarian Poetry (1921), which included two poems by Salt. At Salt's funeral, Lloyd read Salt's self-written funeral address.

==== Sexual diversity, gender equality, and legal reform ====
Lloyd wrote in support of sexual diversity and legal reform. In a 1913 article for The New Freewoman, he discussed Magnus Hirschfeld's exhibit on intermediary sexual types, criticised the persecution of homosexuals, and described gender and sexuality as continuums. He later visited Hirschfeld's Institute for Sexual Science in Berlin. Lloyd also supported women's suffrage, a position linked by Lesley A. Hall to his rejection of fixed gender categories.

Lloyd was a member of the British Society for the Study of Sex Psychology (BSSSP), founded in 1914. With figures including Edward Carpenter and Laurence Housman, he supported reforms in sexual education, LGBTQ+ rights, and divorce law.

==== Pacifism ====
Cover of The Paths of Glory

During the First World War, Lloyd was a conscientious objector. He corresponded with Olive Schreiner about pacifism, was involved in the Union of Democratic Control and the No-Conscription Fellowship, and was part of a London pacifist circle. Schreiner sought his comments on her anti-war writings. Lloyd was also active in the Independent Labour Party.

In 1918, Lloyd edited Poems Written During the Great War, 1914–1918, a collection of anti-war poems. In 1919, he published a second anti-war anthology, The Paths of Glory.

==== Animal welfare and rights ====
In 1932, Lloyd co-founded the National Society for the Abolition of Cruel Sports, where he served as Honorary Secretary until his death. In 1939, he wrote Foxhunters' Philosophy: A Garland from Five Centuries, an educational booklet for the society. Lloyd was also a vegetarian and wrote on vegetarianism.

=== Naturalist career ===
Lloyd wrote on birds and dragonflies. He contributed to British Birds on subjects including the stone-curlew in Buckinghamshire (1921), egg-laying in Grassholm gannets (1926), a rare sighting of a marsh warbler in Hertfordshire (1941), and the birdlife of Texel. In Entomologist, he reported on a mass emergence of the dragonfly Coenagrion puella (1941) and on dragonflies in Pembrokeshire (1944). Lloyd was a member of the British Ornithologists' Union and a Fellow of the Linnean Society of London.

Lloyd was active in the Hertfordshire Natural History Society for about 20 years. He edited its Transactions from 1935 until his death and contributed articles including "The Nesting of Garganeys at Elstree" (1931) and "The Distribution of the Grass Snake in Hertfordshire, with Notes on its Behaviour" (1936). After the death of Charles Oldham, he edited the society's bird reports for 1939, 1940, and 1941. He was also the society's recorder for mammals, reptiles, and amphibians.

=== Personal life and death ===
In 1938, Lloyd married Sylvia Colenso (b. 1887) in Cardigan, Wales. She was a pianist, and both were interested in music.

Lloyd climbed and scrambled in Wales and the Lake District in his youth. He later climbed in Norway, the Austrian and Swiss Alps, the Dolomites, and Yugoslavia, often with his wife. He spent time in Pembrokeshire.

Lloyd had poor health toward the end of his life. He became a Fellow of the Royal Entomological Society two days before his death at Champneys, near Tring, on 9 June 1944, aged 63. He wrote his own epitaph, which ended: "He cared not a farthing for Heaven or God, / But valued far more an inch of green sod."

== Selected publications ==
- (ed.) Poems Written During the Great War, 1914–1918. London: George Allen & Unwin. 1918.
- (ed.) The Paths of Glory: A Collection of Poems Written During the War, 1914–1919. London: George Allen & Unwin. 1919.
- (ed.) The Great Kinship: An Anthology of Humanitarian Poetry. London: George Allen & Unwin. 1921.
- On the Behaviour of Male Mallards with Broods. London: Macmillan. 1937.
- (ed.) Foxhunters' Philosophy: A Garland from Five Centuries (PDF). National Society for the Abolition of Cruel Sports. 1939.
- Poems and Miscellaneous Translations. Self-published. 1944.
- "The Boncath Kite". Folklore. 55 (4): 166–167. 1944. doi:10.1080/0015587X.1944.9717743. ISSN 0015-587X. JSTOR 1257796.
- A Vile Sport: Facts about Otterhunting. National Society for the Abolition of Cruel Sports. 1945.
- Dandy, James Edgar, ed. (1948). Notes on the Flora of Pembrokeshire. Introduction by Sylvia Lloyd. Arbroath.
- Winter Trees and Tones. Biographical note by Samuel Joseph Looker. Riverside Press. 1949.
- Humanitarianism and Freedom. Manchester: Humane Education Society. 1949.
