= Peter Stewart Macliver =

Scottish journalist and Liberal MP for Plymouth

- Macliver in 1880

Member of Parliament for Plymouth
- In office 1880–1885

Personal details
- Born: 1822
- Died: 19 April 1891 (aged 68–69)
- Party: Liberal

Peter Stewart Macliver (1822 – 19 April 1891) was a Scottish journalist and Liberal MP who sat in the House of Commons from 1880 to 1885.

== Life ==
Macliver was the son of David Macliver of Kilchoman, Islay. He was educated at Glasgow High School, and the University of Glasgow. Macliver then became a journalist, and co-founded the Western Daily Press in Bristol, in 1858. He was also a J.P. for Somerset.

At the 1880 general election, Macliver was elected as a member of parliament for Plymouth. He held the seat until his defeat at the 1885 election.

Macliver died at the age of 68.

Macliver married Anne Miller in 1842. He was a cousin of Field Marshal Baron Clyde.

Parliament of the United Kingdom
Preceded by Sampson Lloyd; Sir Edward Bates, Bt	Member of Parliament for Plymouth; 1880 – 1885; With: Sir Edward Bates, Bt to July 1880; Edward Clarke from July 1880	Succeeded by Sir Edward Bates, Bt; Edward Clarke
Trade union offices
Preceded by John David Jenkins	President of the Amalgamated Society of Railway Servants; 1877–1892	Succeeded by Walter Hudson
