= Lloyd family (Birmingham) =

Welsh Quaker family

The Lloyd family of Birmingham was a prominent Welsh Quaker family who migrated in the seventeenth century to Birmingham, England, from Dolobran Hall near Meifod, Powys (previously in Montgomeryshire), Wales. The family were involved in manufacturing and in the establishment of Lloyds Bank. The principal residence of the senior branch of the Birmingham family was Farm, Bordesley.

At the outbreak of the First World War Gertrude and John Henry Lloyd had four sons of military age:

- Alan Scrivener Lloyd who enlisted in the Royal Field Artillery and was killed on 4 August 1916 at Ypres.
- Ronald Lloyd joined the Friends' Ambulance Unit in 1914, but following Alan's death enlisted in the Royal Field Artillery.
- Eric Lloyd joined the Friends' Ambulance Unit in 1914 and enlisted in the Navy in 1916.
- Gerald Lloyd was a conscientious objector and undertook alternative civilian service with the YMCA.

== Notable family members ==
Prominent members of the family included:

- Sampson Lloyd (1664–1724), iron manufacturer and founder of the family.
- Sampson Lloyd II (1699–1779), co-founded Lloyds Bank.
- Charles Lloyd (1748–1828), banker and philanthropist.
- Charles Lloyd (1775–1839), poet and friend of Charles Lamb, Samuel Taylor Coleridge, and Thomas de Quincey.
- Sampson Lloyd (1820–1889), MP and chairman of Lloyds Bank.
- John Henry Lloyd, Lord Mayor of Birmingham, 1901–1902.
- Bertram Lloyd (1881–1944), social reformer and naturalist.

== See also ==
- Lloyd (name)
