= Farm, Bordesley =

Historic estate in Birmingham, England

Coordinates: 52.4650°N 1.8729°W

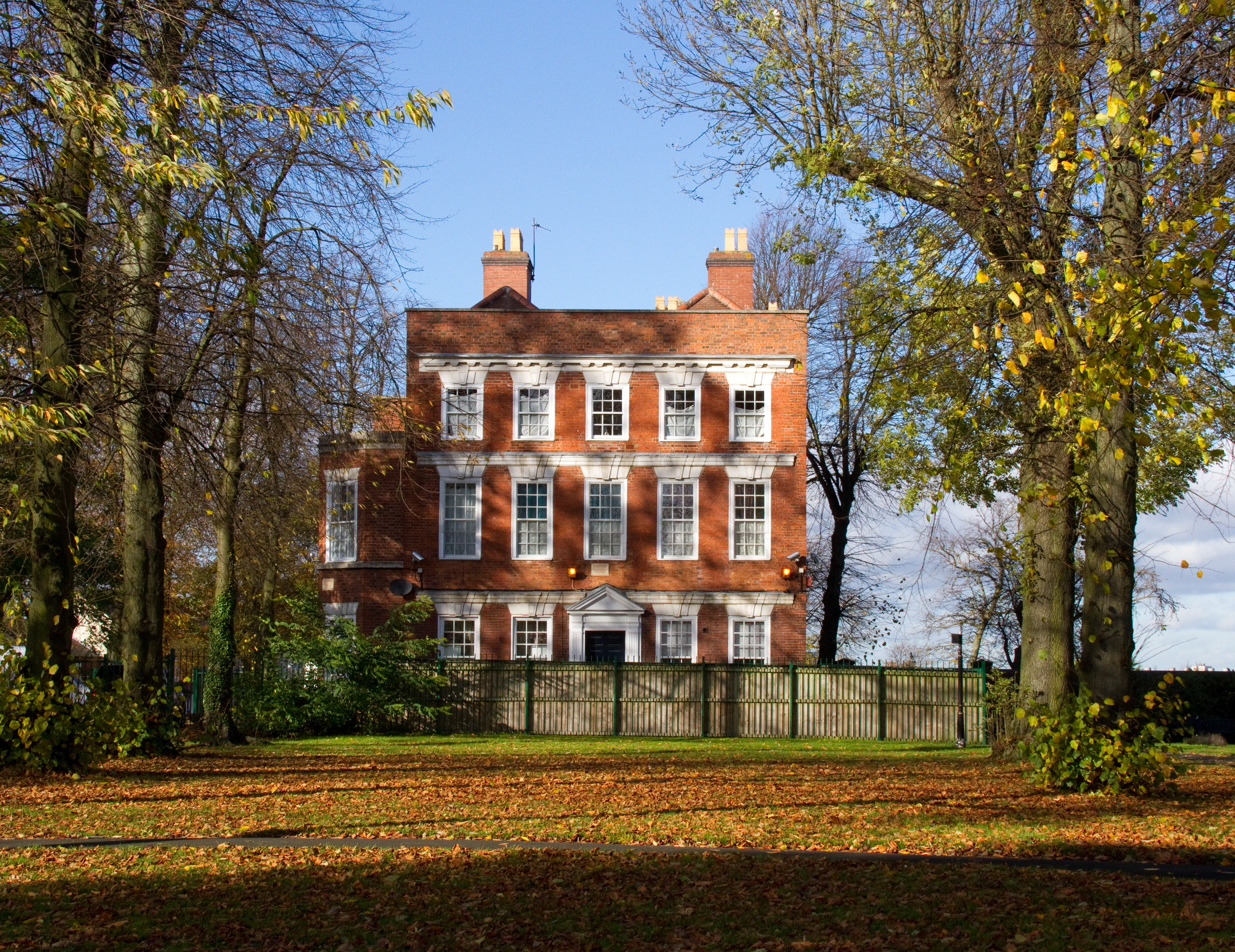
Farm, the Georgian mansion built on the "Owen's Farm" estate within the manor of Bordesley, by Sampson II Lloyd (1699–1779). Still set within a ten acre remnant (a public recreation ground known as "Farm Park") of its former 56 acre grounds. Now surrounded by the urban landscape of Sparkbrook and the suburbs of Birmingham

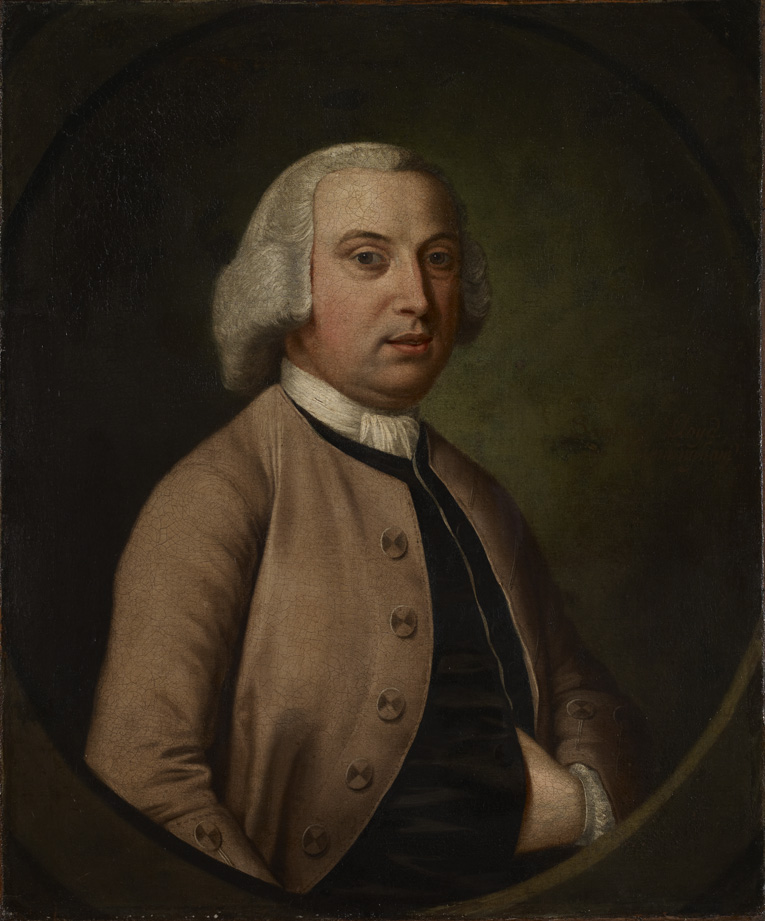
Portrait of Sampson Lloyd II (1699–1779) an iron-master and co-founder of Lloyds Bank, who purchased the estate in 1742 and built the surviving Georgian mansion, which he called "The Farm" or "Farm". Collection of Birmingham Museum and Art Gallery

Farm is a historic estate within the former manor of Bordesley, now situated in the area of Sparkbrook, a suburb of Birmingham, England. It has been described as the "focal point in family mythology" for the prominent and wide-spread Lloyd family, Quakers, iron producers and founders of Lloyds Bank.

== History ==
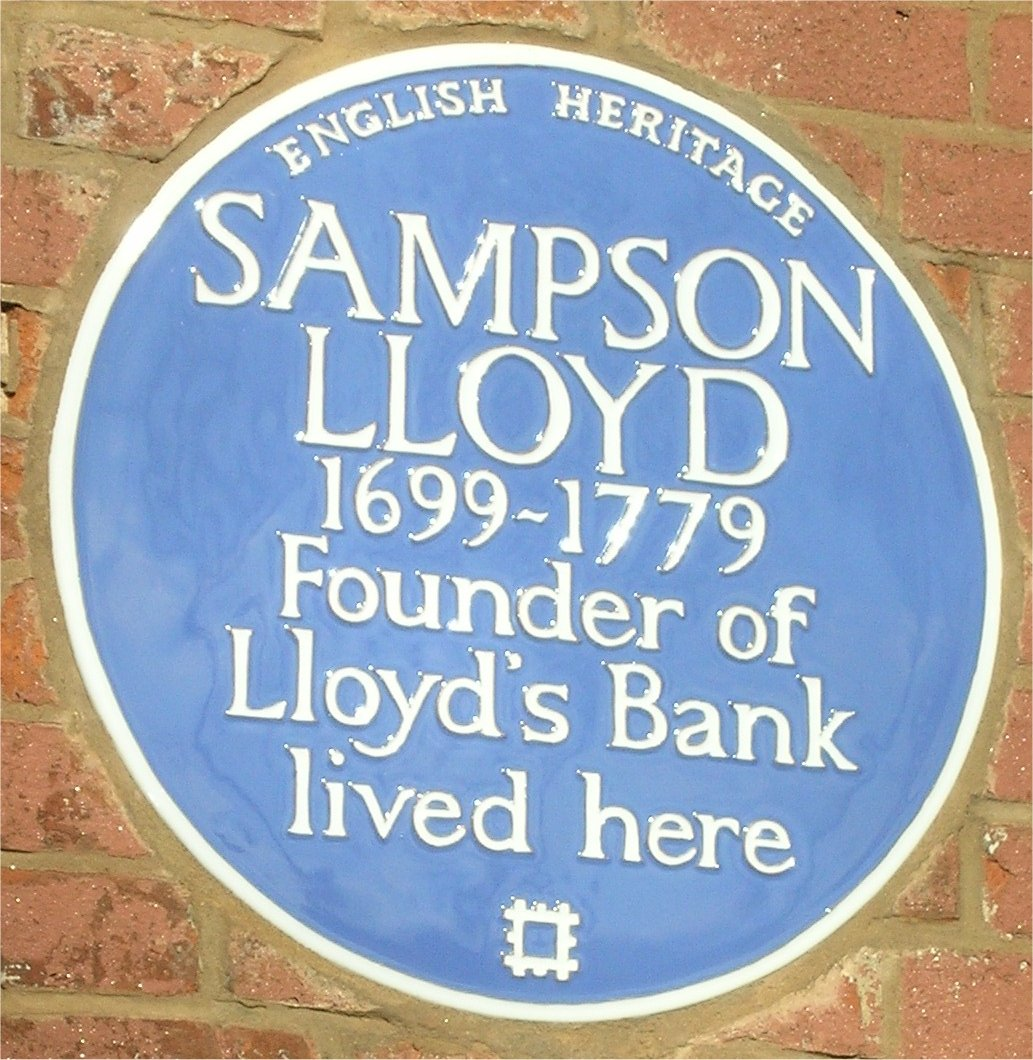
English Heritage blue plaque on the building

The former 56-acre "Owen's Farm" with an Elizabethan farmhouse in the manor of Bordesley, now in the locality of Sparkbrook, was purchased in 1742 by Sampson II Lloyd (1699–1779) of nearby Edgbaston Street, Birmingham, an iron-master who later in 1765 co-founded Lloyds Bank. He was descended from the ancient family of Lloyd of Dolobran Hall in Montgomeryshire (now Powys) in Wales. He retained the Tudor farmhouse and built near it "Farm" an eponymous mansion house, which survives as a grade II* listed building known today as "Lloyd's Farmhouse, Farm Park, 139 Sampson Road, Birmingham", one of the most important of the rare surviving Georgian buildings in the city of Birmingham. An English Heritage blue plaque is affixed to the building.

The original "Owen's Farmhouse" still stood in the grounds of the Georgian house in 1907, "a very beautiful piece of Tudor architecture", possibly then the oldest house in Birmingham. Lloyd spent most of his time in his large town house in Edgbaston Street, Birmingham, returning to Farm, his rural retreat, at weekends. Over time the location became unfashionable and surrounded by housing, and the family moved to Edgbaston Grove, a home in a more fashionable location. Farm was donated to the City in the 1920s by John Henry Lloyd (1855-1944), of Edgbaston Grove, Birmingham, Lord Mayor of Birmingham in 1901-1902 (only son of George Braithwaite Lloyd (1824-1903) by his wife Mary Hutchinson) and the grounds laid out as a public park. One of his four sons, Alan Scrivener Lloyd (d. 1916), MC, broke the family tradition of pacifism and was killed in action at Ypres in World War I. It is now a regional home for the Bromford Housing Group. "Farm Park" (bounded by Sampson Road, Kendall Road, Dolobran Road and a row of terraces on Dearman Road (all names connected with the Lloyd family)) within which "Farm House" stands today, is a public park consisting of part of the former grounds of the mansion, surrounded by the densely built urban landscape of Sparkbrook.

== Sources ==
=== Lloyd family history ===
==== Leading authorities ====
The three main authorities on the Lloyd family are as follows:

- Lowe, Rachel J., Farm and its Inhabitants with Some Account of the Lloyds of Dolobran, London, 1883.
- Lloyd, Samuel, The Lloyds of Birmingham with some Account of the Founding of Lloyd's Bank, 2nd edition, Birmingham & London: Cornish, 1907. (The author Samuel III Lloyd (1827-1918) was the owner and occupant of Farm in 1907 (per p. 32))
- Lloyd, Humphrey, Quaker Lloyds in the Industrial Revolution, 1660-1860, 1975

==== Other sources ====
- Gilbert, T.R., & Boothroyd, J.B., The Lloyds of Lloyd's Bank, Supplement to "The Dark Horse", Lloyds Bank Staff Magazine, June, 1951, 24pp.
- Anna Lloyd (Braithwaite) Thomas (1924). The Quaker seekers of Wales: A story of the Lloyds of Dolobran.
- Lewys Dunn (1846), Heraldic Visitations of Wales and Part of the Marches, Vol 1, pg. 294.
- Rees T. M.(1925), A history of the Quakers in Wales and their emigration to North America
- Lloyd family, of Dolobran, Mont., Dictionary of Welsh Biography
- Burke's Genealogical and Heraldic History of the Landed Gentry, 15th Edition, ed. Pirie-Gordon, H., London, 1937, pp. 1392-3, pedigree of Lloyd of Dolobran
- Burke, John, A Genealogical and Heraldic History of the Commoners of Great Britain and Ireland, Vol.4, London, 1838, pp.107-114, pedigree of "Lloyd of Dolobran"
- Dolobran Estate Records, National Library of Wales, ref: GB 0210 DOLOBRAN
- Lloyd, Alan, Cousins' Party at the Downs School, 29th May 2004 (esp. re later descent of Farm)
