= Sampson Lloyd =

English iron manufacturer and banker

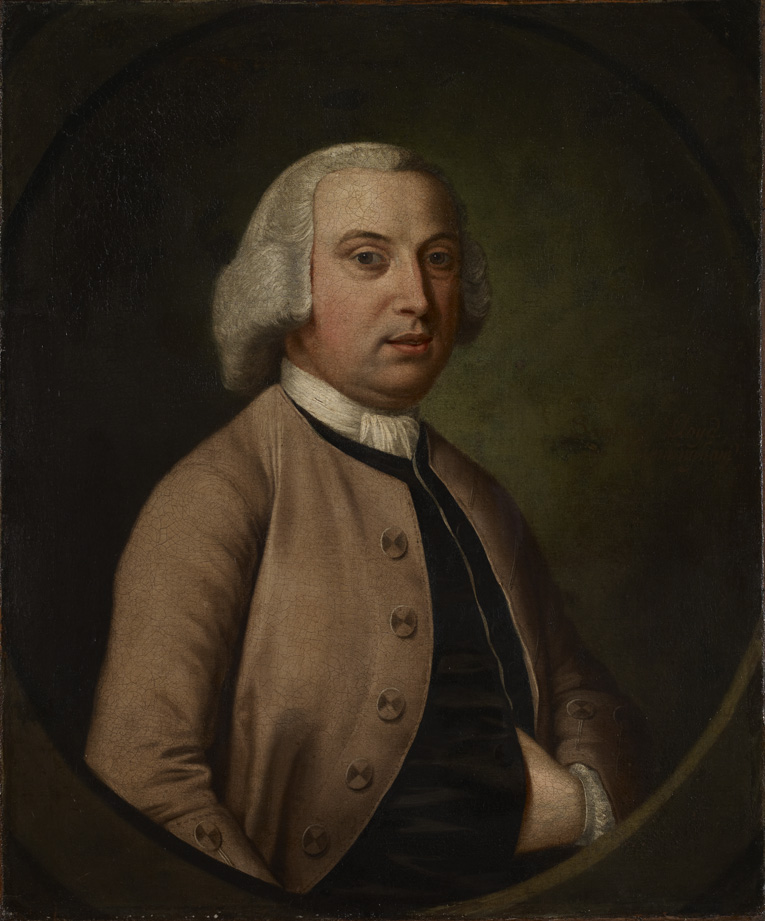
- Portrait of Sampson Lloyd
- Born: 15 May 1699; Birmingham, Warwickshire, England
- Died: 1779 (aged 79–80) Kingdom Of Great Britain
- Known for: Co-founding Lloyds Bank
- Spouses: Sarah Parkes (m. 1727; died 1729) Rachel Champion (m. 1731; died 1766)
- Children: 11, including Charles Lloyd
- Father: Sampson Lloyd
- Relatives: Charles Lloyd (grandson); Anna Braithwaite (granddaughter)

Sampson Lloyd II (15 May 1699 – 1779) was an English iron manufacturer and banker, who co-founded Lloyds Bank. He was a member of the notable Lloyd family of Birmingham.

== Career ==
Sampson Lloyd was the third son of Sampson Lloyd (1664–1724) and Mary (née Crowley, sister of Ambrose Crowley), Quakers of Welsh origin, who had moved from their Leominster, Herefordshire farm to Edgbaston Street in Birmingham in 1698.

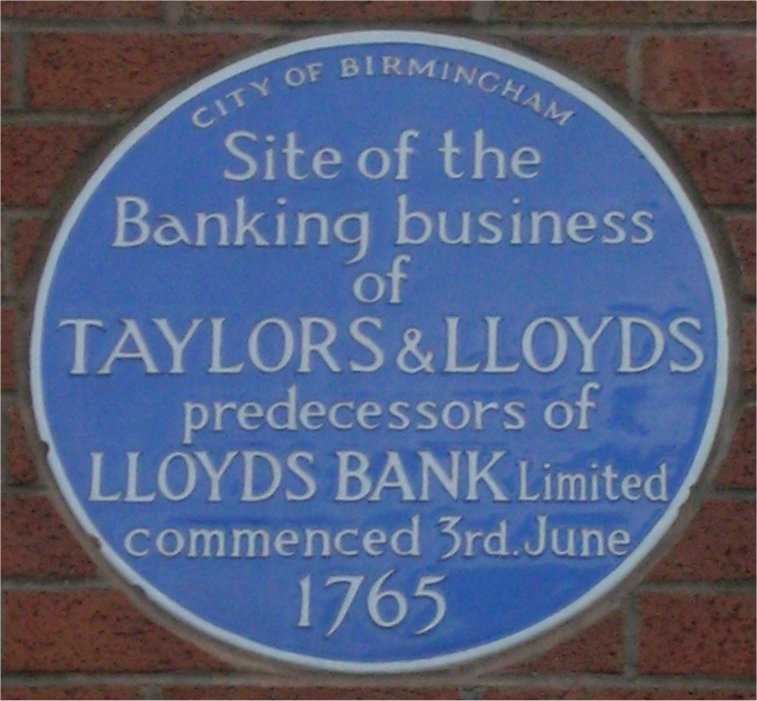
Blue plaque on the site of Birmingham's first bank in Dale End

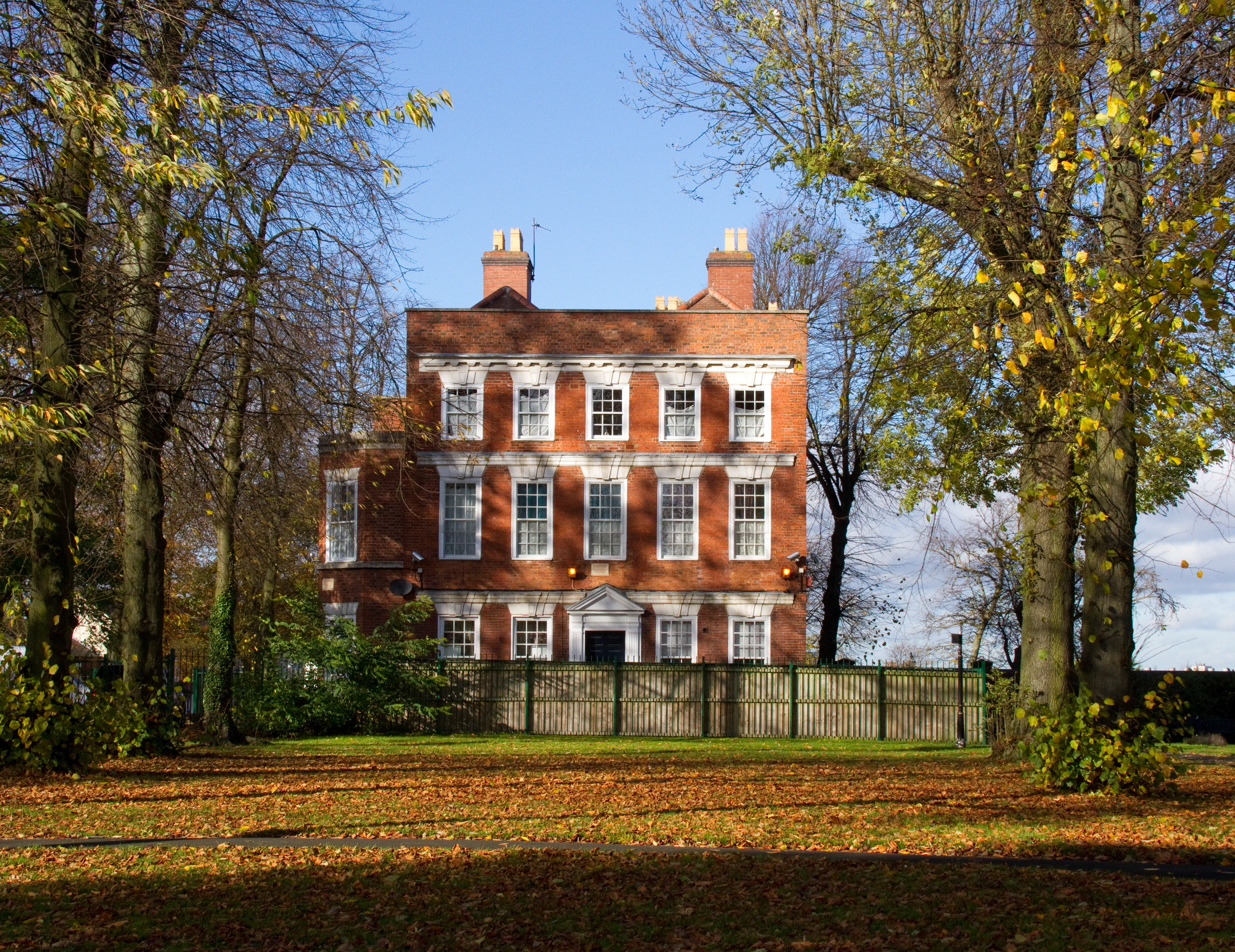
"Farm", in the former manor of Bordesley, now amidst the urban landscape of Sparkbrook, Birmingham

After the death of his father in 1725, he and his older brother, Charles (1696–1741) bought the Town Mill and traded in iron. He also bought a forge in Burton upon Trent. After Charles' death in 1741, Lloyd became wealthy and in 1742 bought for £1,290 a 56-acre estate called "Owen's Farm" in the manor of Bordesley (in the area now known as Sparkbrook) on the edge of the town of Birmingham. He retained the Tudor farmhouse and built a Georgian mansion nearby which he called "Farm", now a grade II* listed building.

Lloyd continued to live partly in his former townhouse in Edgbaston Street, Birmingham, near his ironworks. In 1765, at the age of 66, he formed a company with his son (also named Sampson) and the leading Birmingham button maker John Taylor (1704–1775), and his son, creating Birmingham's first bank: Taylor's and Lloyds, located at 7 Dale End. This is the bank that became Lloyds Bank, now part of Lloyds Banking Group.

== Personal life ==
Lloyd married twice. His first marriage in 1727 was to Sarah Parkes (1699–1729), daughter of Richard Parkes (died 1729). His son by this marriage, Sampson, was also a founder of another company, Taylor, Lloyd, Hanbury and Bowman in Lombard Street in London.

Lloyd's second wife, whom he married in 1731, was Rachel Champion (1712–1766), daughter of Nehemiah Champion (1678–1747). There were four sons and two daughters who survived to adulthood of this second marriage, including Charles Lloyd (1748–1828) the second son. He was also a partner in the bank; his son, Charles Lloyd, the poet, was only briefly involved in banking.

== Sources ==
- A History of Birmingham, Chris Upton, 1993, ISBN 0-85033-870-0
- The Lloyds of Lloyds Bank - An examination into Family History, Gilbert.
