= Sampson Lloyd (MP) =

British banker and Conservative Party politician

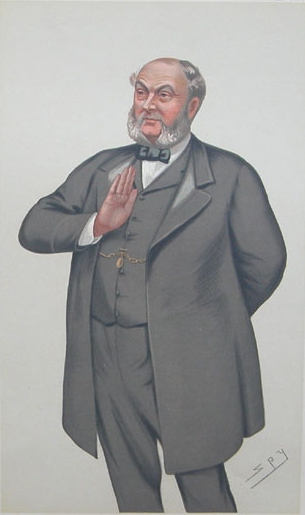
"Fair Trade" Lloyd as caricatured by Spy (Leslie Ward) in Vanity Fair, March 1882

Sampson Samuel Lloyd (10 November 1820 – 3 March 1889) was a British banker and Conservative Party politician. He became chairman of Lloyds Bank and held a seat in the House of Commons for six years between 1874 and 1885.

== Career ==
Lloyd was the eldest son of George Braithwaite Lloyd, of The Farm in Sparkbrook, Birmingham, and his wife Mary, the daughter of John P. Dearman (also from Sparkbrook). He was educated at private schools and became a justice of the peace (J.P.) for Warwickshire and for City of Birmingham. By 1884 he was chairman of Lloyds Bank. For several years he was also chairman of the Associated Chambers of Commerce of the United Kingdom.

He was unsuccessful on the first two occasions when he stood for Parliament, firstly at a by-election in July 1867 in the Liberal Party stronghold of Birmingham, and then at the 1868 general election in Birmingham. In his election address in 1868 Lloyd took a strong antidisestablishmentarian stance on proposals to disestablish the (Anglican) Church of Ireland, warning that such a move would undermine the Protestant basis of the British constitution, and fearing that it would lead to "a great increase in the political power of the hierarchy established in that country by the Court of Rome".

At the 1874 general election he was elected as a member of parliament (MP) for Plymouth, winning a seat that had been held since 1865 by the Liberals. He held the seat for five years, until his defeat at the 1880 general election by the Liberal Peter Macliver.

Lloyd was returned to the Commons at a by-election in November 1884 for South Warwickshire. He held that seat until the constituency was abolished at the 1885 general election, when he was defeated by the Liberal Lord William Compton in the new Stratford-on-Avon division of Warwickshire.

== Personal life ==
Lloyd married twice, firstly in 1844 to Emma, the daughter of Samuel Reeve from Leighton Buzzard. He married again in 1865 to Marie, the daughter of his Excellency Lieutenant-General Friedrich Wilhelm Menckhoff (1789–1866) of the Prussian Army. One of his grandsons, George Ambrose Lloyd, was also a member of parliament.

== See also ==
- Sampson Lloyd

Parliament of the United Kingdom
Preceded by Walter Morrison; Edward Bates	Member of Parliament for Plymouth; 1874 – 1880; With: Edward Bates	Succeeded by Peter Macliver; Edward Bates
Preceded by Gilbert Leigh; Sir John Eardley-Wilmot, Bt	Member of Parliament for South Warwickshire; 1884 – 1885; With: Sir John Eardley-Wilmot, Bt	Constituency abolished
