= Eustace Loraine =

British aviator

Eustace Broke Loraine
- Born: 3 September 1879; London, England
- Died: 5 July 1912 (aged 32); Bulford Camp Hospital, Wiltshire, England
- Military career
- Allegiance: United Kingdom
- Branch: British Army
- Service years: 1899–1912
- Rank: Captain
- Units: Grenadier Guards; Royal Flying Corps

Eustace Broke Loraine (3 September 1879 – 5 July 1912) was a pioneer British aviator and the first Royal Flying Corps officer to be killed in an aircraft crash.

Eustace Loraine was the first child of Rear-Admiral Sir Lambton Loraine, 11th Baronet and his wife Frederica Mary Horatia (née Broke). His younger brother Percy was born in 1880. He was the great grandson of Rear Admiral Sir Philip Broke a distinguished naval officer.

== Service in Africa ==
Loraine was gazetted as a Second Lieutenant on 5 July 1899 with the Grenadier Guards. He was promoted to Lieutenant in May 1900 a month after his arrival in South Africa where he served until May 1902 when he returned to England. He served as adjutant, Grenadier Guards from July 1905 until September 1906. Promoted to Captain in July 1907 he was selected for the West African Frontier Force in October 1908. He later served in Nigeria on the headquarters staff in Lagos and as a section commander on Colonel Trenchard's 1907 / 1908 expedition to the Munshi tribe. In 1909 whilst Loraine was still in Nigeria, reports reached him of Louis Blériot's flight across the English Channel. This news stirred Loraine's curiosity and he decided to find out more about flying.

== Pioneer aviator ==
The War Office was content to pay for Loraine's flying training and he was seconded from the Grenadier Guards in order that he might learn to fly. Loraine successfully completed his flying training and was granted Royal Aero Club certificate number 154 which was dated 7 November 1911.

Loraine was in correspondence with Trenchard, who was serving in Ireland, and he kept Trenchard informed about his progress as an aviator. On one occasion in Spring / Summer 1912, Loraine wrote to Trenchard urging him to learn to fly. Trenchard was greatly impressed by Loraine's words which read "You've no idea what you're missing, ... Come and see men like ants crawling." At that time Trenchard was looking for a new direction and after reading Loraine's letter he decided to try to learn to fly. Trenchard went on to command the Flying Corps in France during World War I and then serve as the Royal Air Force's first Chief of the Air Staff.

At some stage in 1911 or early 1912, Lorraine was attached to No. 2 Company of the Air Battalion which was based at Larkhill on Salisbury Plain. On 13 May 1912, with the establishment of the Royal Flying Corps, No. 2 Company was redesignated No. 3 Squadron RFC and Loraine remained at Larkhill.

== Death ==
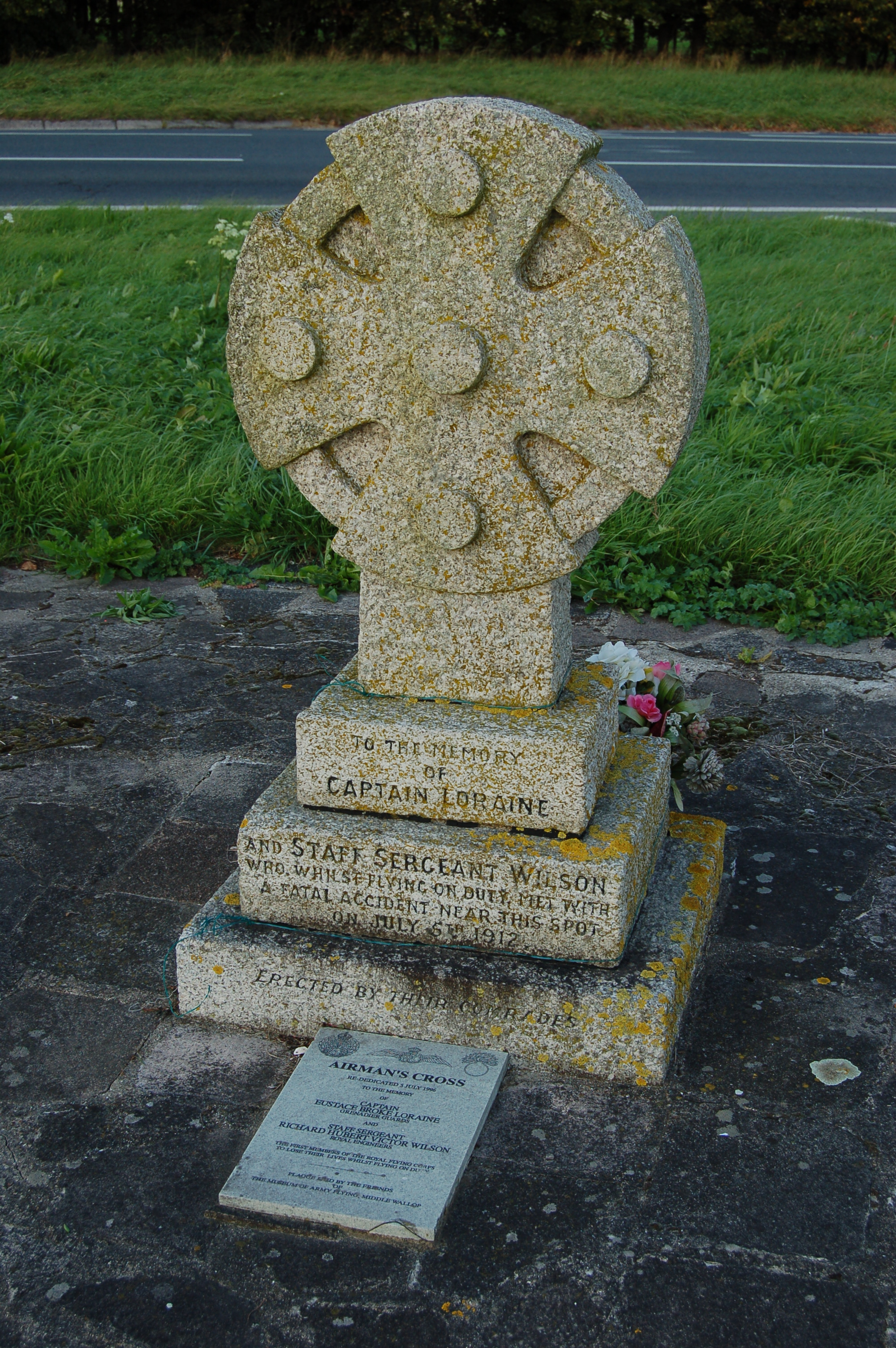
Memorial to Captain Loraine and Staff-Sergeant Wilson in original location

Less than two months later and exactly 13 years since he joined the Army, Loraine and his passenger Staff Sergeant R H V Wilson were flying a Nieuport Monoplane out of Larkhill on a routine morning practice sortie. They were executing a tight turn when the aircraft fell towards the ground and crashed. Wilson was killed outright and although Loraine was speedily transported to Bulford Hospital in a horse-drawn ambulance, he succumbed to his wounds only a few minutes after arriving at the hospital. Loraine and Wilson were the first Flying Corps personnel to die in an aircraft crash while on duty. Later in the day an order was issued which stated "Flying will continue this evening as usual", thus beginning a tradition.

The site of the crash at Greenlands Bottom, near the old intersection of the A344 and the A360 roads and less than a mile west of Stonehenge, is now known as 'Airman's Cross'. A stone cross memorial was placed in the middle of the grass island at the junction. The inscription reads:

'To the memory of Captain Loraine and Staff-Sergeant Wilson who whilst flying on duty, met with a fatal accident near this spot on 5 July 1912. Erected by their comrades'.

On 25 June 2012 the memorial was removed from its roadside position to make way for a new roundabout leading to a new visitors' centre at Stonehenge. It was kept in storage in Royal Engineers' barracks at Perham Down until it was re-erected within the area of the new Stonehenge visitors' centre, which opened in December 2013.

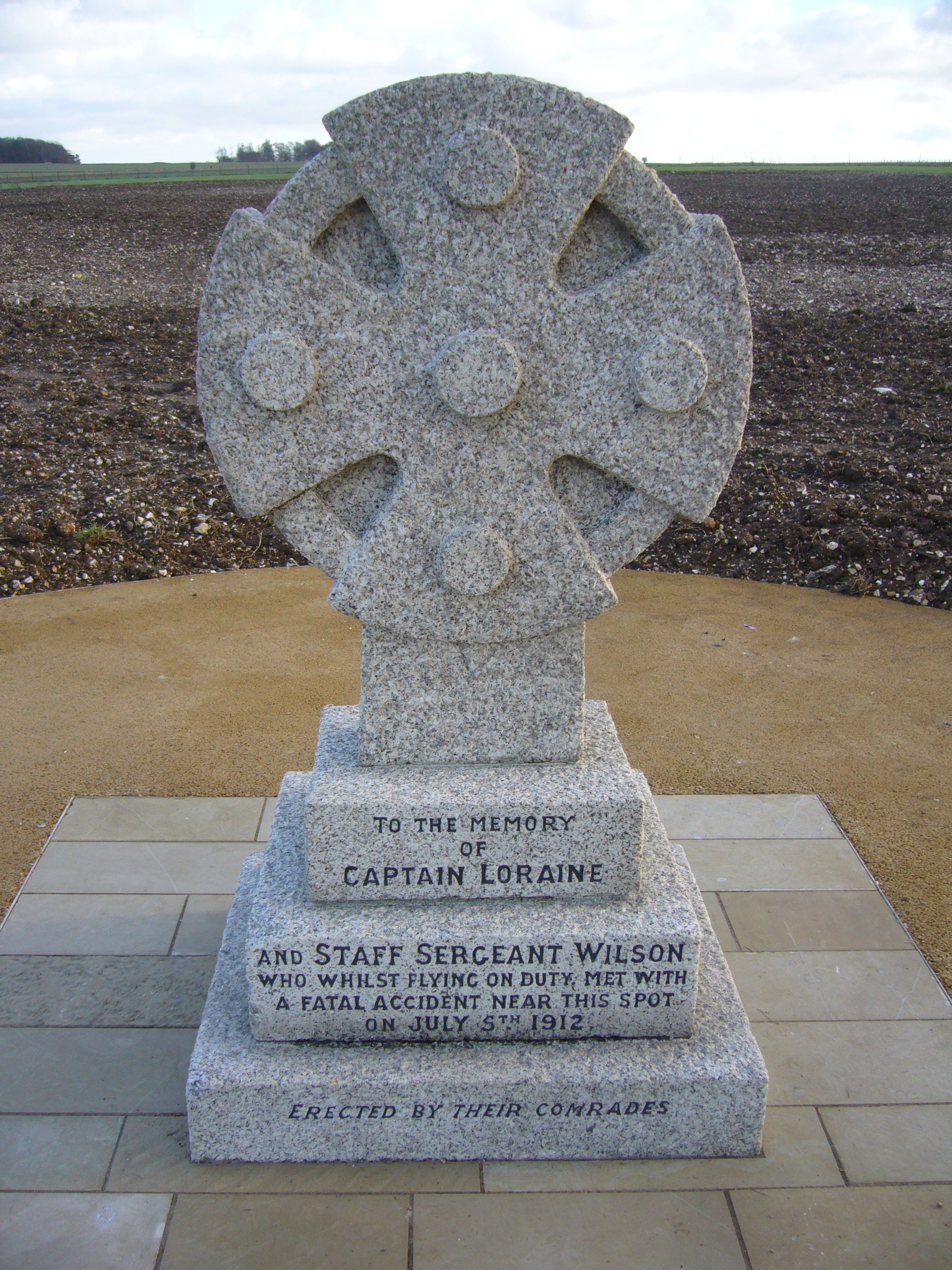
The new location of the memorial outside the Stonehenge Visitors' Centre (Dec 2013)

== See also ==
- List of accidents and incidents involving military aircraft before 1925
- Larkhill
