= William Loraine =

William Loraine may refer to:

- Sir William Loraine, 2nd Baronet (1658–1744), MP for Northumberland
- Sir William Loraine, 4th Baronet (1749–1809), of the Loraine baronets
- Sir William Loraine, 6th Baronet (1801–1849), of the Loraine baronets
- Sir William Loraine, 9th Baronet (1780–851), of the Loraine baronets
