= Capability Brown =

English landscape architect

Lancelot "Capability" Brown
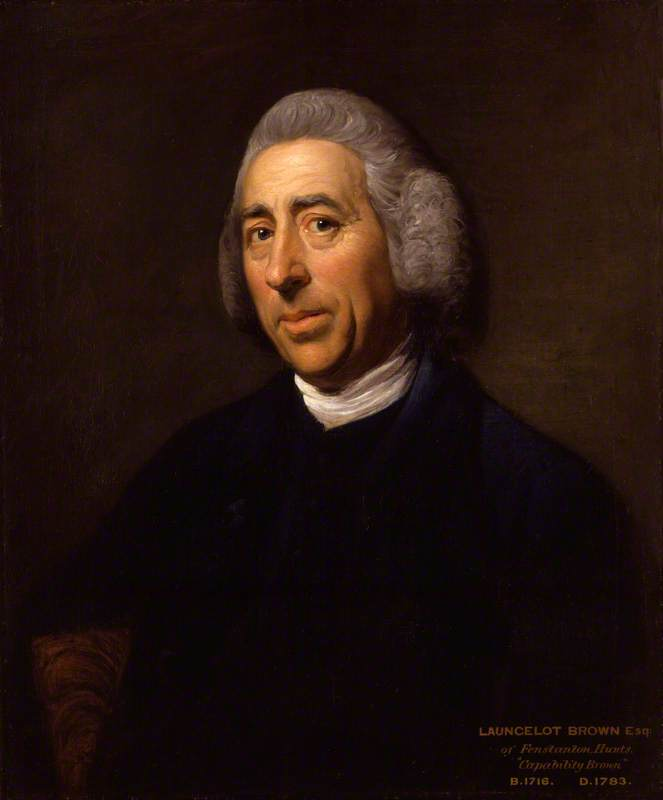
- Portrait of Capability Brown by Nathaniel Dance, 1769
- Born: Lancelot Brown; Kirkharle, Northumberland, England
- Baptised: 30 August 1716
- Died: 6 February 1783 (aged 67–68); London, England
- Occupations: Gardener; Landscape architect
- Spouse: Bridget Wayet (m. 1744)
- Children: 8

Lancelot "Capability" Brown (born c. 1715–16, baptised 30 August 1716 – 6 February 1783) was an English gardener and landscape architect, a notable figure in the history of the English landscape garden style.

Unlike other architects including William Kent, he was a hands-on gardener and provided his clients with a full turnkey service, designing the gardens and park, and then managing their landscaping and planting. He is most famous for the landscaped parks of English country houses, many of which have survived reasonably intact. However, he also included in his plans "pleasure gardens" with flower gardens and the new shrubberies, usually placed where they would not obstruct the views across the park of and from the main facades of the house. Few of his plantings of "pleasure gardens" have survived later changes. He also submitted plans for much smaller urban projects, for example the college gardens along The Backs at Cambridge.

Criticism of his style, both in his own day and subsequently, mostly centres on the claim that "he created 'identikit' landscapes with the main house in a sea of turf, some water, albeit often an impressive feature, and trees in clumps and shelterbelts", giving "a uniformity equating to authoritarianism" and showing a lack of imagination and even taste on the part of his patrons.

He designed more than 170 parks, many of which survive to this day. He was nicknamed "Capability" because he would tell his clients that their property had "capability" for improvement. His influence was so great that the contributions to the English garden made by his predecessors Charles Bridgeman and William Kent are often overlooked; even Kent's champion Horace Walpole allowed that Kent "was succeeded by a very able master".

== Early life and Stowe ==
Lancelot Brown was the fifth child of a land agent and a chambermaid, born in the village of Kirkharle, Northumberland, and educated at a school in Cambo until he was 16. Brown's father, William Brown, had been Sir William Loraine's land agent and his mother, Ursula (née Hall), had been in service at Kirkharle Hall. His eldest brother, John, became the estate surveyor and later married Sir William's daughter. His older brother George became a mason-architect.

After school Lancelot worked as the head gardener's apprentice at Sir William Loraine's kitchen garden at Kirkharle Hall until he was 23. In 1739 he journeyed south to the port of Boston, Lincolnshire. Then he moved further inland, where his first landscape commission was for a new lake in the park at Kiddington Hall, Oxfordshire. He moved to Wotton Underwood House, Buckinghamshire, seat of Sir Richard Grenville.

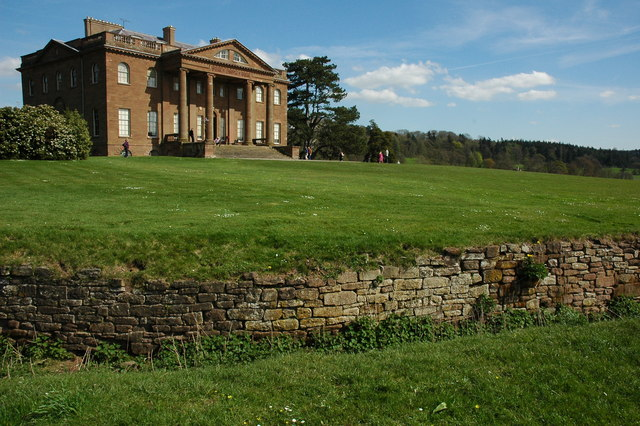
Ha-ha (the hidden ditch in the foreground) and house at Berrington Hall in Herefordshire, Brown's last big project, a new-build designed by his son-in-law, placed to exploit views in two directions.

In 1741, Brown joined Lord Cobham's gardening staff as undergardener at Stowe Gardens, Buckinghamshire, where he worked under William Kent, one of the founders of the new English style of landscape garden. In 1742, at the age of 26, he was officially appointed Head Gardener, earning £25 (equivalent to £4,800 in 2025 (over £7000 in 2026. However, if measured against the av. skilled worker at the time, the same £25 represents an economic status or earning power closer to 45 000)) a year and residing in the western Boycott Pavilion.

Brown remained at Stowe until 1751. He made the Grecian Valley at Stowe under William Kent's supervision. It is an abstract composition of landform and woodland. Lord Cobham let Brown take freelance work from his aristocratic friends, thus making him well known as a landscape gardener. As a proponent of the new English style, Brown became immensely sought after by the landed families. By 1751, when Brown was beginning to be widely known, Horace Walpole wrote somewhat slightingly of Brown's work at Warwick Castle:

The castle is enchanting; the view pleased me more than I can express, the River Avon tumbles down a cascade at the foot of it. It is well laid out by one Brown who has set up on a few ideas of Kent and Mr. Southcote.

By the 1760s he was earning on average £6,000 (equivalent to £917,000 in 2025) a year, usually £500 (equivalent to £76,400 in 2025) for one commission. As an accomplished rider he was able to work fast, taking only an hour or so on horseback to survey an estate and rough out an entire design. In 1764, Brown was appointed George III's Master Gardener at Hampton Court Palace, succeeding John Greening and residing at the Wilderness House. In 1767 he bought an estate for himself at Fenstanton in Huntingdonshire from Spencer Compton, 8th Earl of Northampton and was appointed High Sheriff of Cambridgeshire and Huntingdonshire for 1770, although his son Lance carried out most of the duties.

== Landscape gardens ==
It is estimated that Brown was responsible for more than 170 gardens surrounding the finest country houses and estates in Britain. His work endures at Belvoir Castle, Croome Court (where he also designed the house), Blenheim Palace, Warwick Castle, Harewood House, Chatsworth, Highclere Castle, Appuldurcombe House, Milton Abbey (and nearby Milton Abbas village), Marden Park (now Woldingham School) and in traces at Kew Gardens and many other locations.

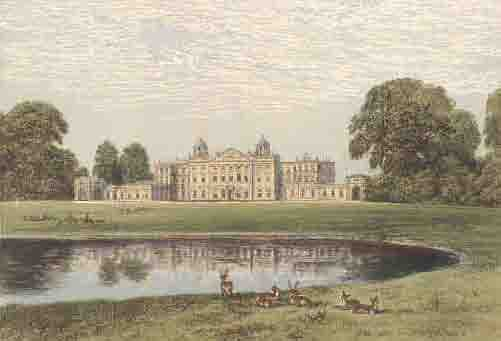
Badminton House in Gloucestershire: features of the Brownian landscape at full maturity in the 19th century

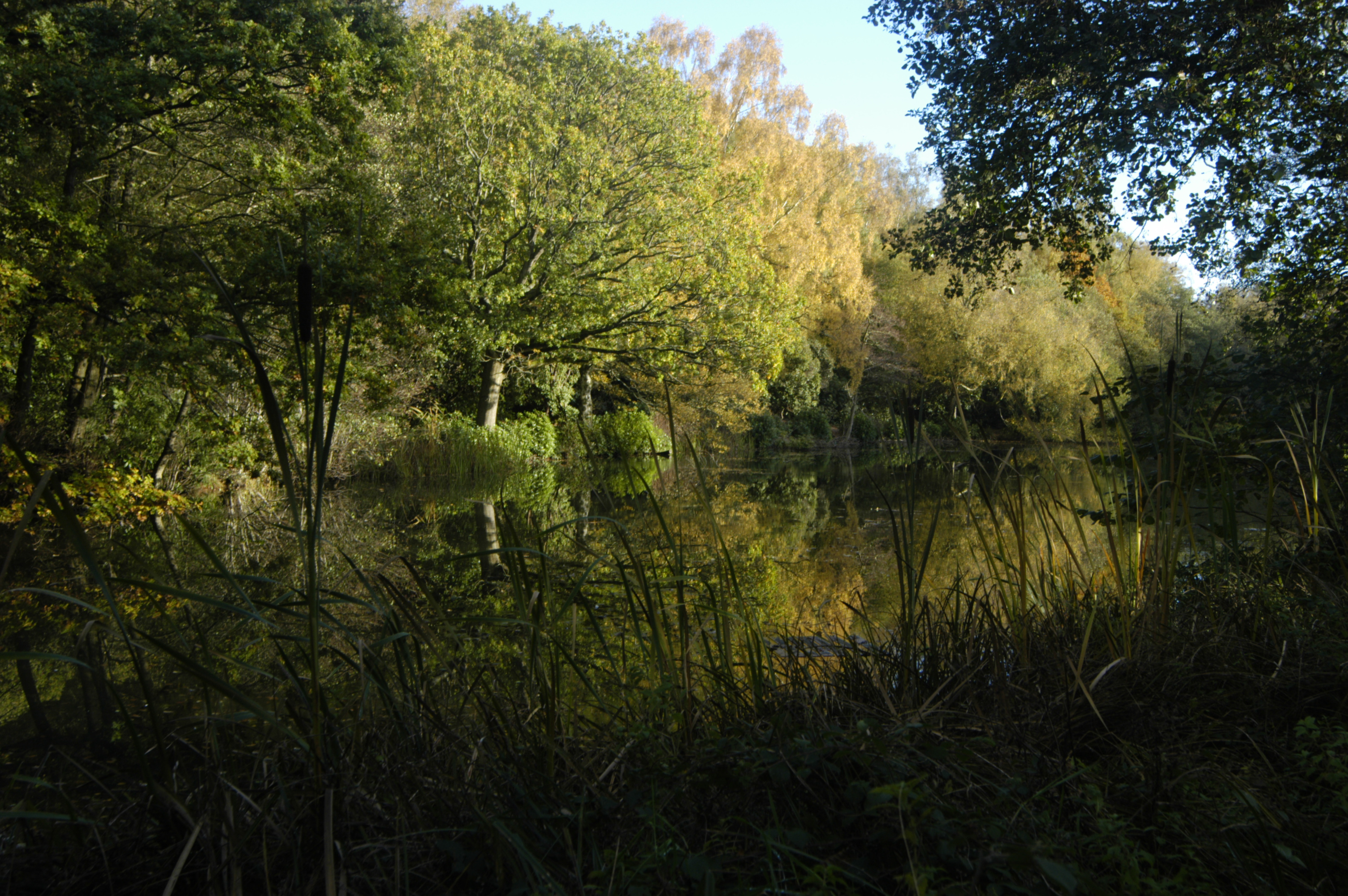
Brown's Pond at Sandleford, Berkshire. One of a string of former priory fish ponds adapted by Brown who was at Sandleford on behalf of Elizabeth Montagu from 1781.

At Hampton Court Brown encountered Hannah More in 1782 and she described his "grammatical" manner in her literary terms: "'Now there' said he, pointing his finger, 'I make a comma, and there' pointing to another spot, 'where a more decided turn is proper, I make a colon; at another part, where an interruption is desirable to break the view, a parenthesis; now a full stop, and then I begin another subject.'" Brown's patrons saw the idealised landscapes he was creating for them in terms of the Italian landscape painters they admired and collected, as Kenneth Woodbridge first observed in the landscape at Stourhead, a "Brownian" landscape (with an un-Brownian circuit walk) in which Brown himself was not involved.

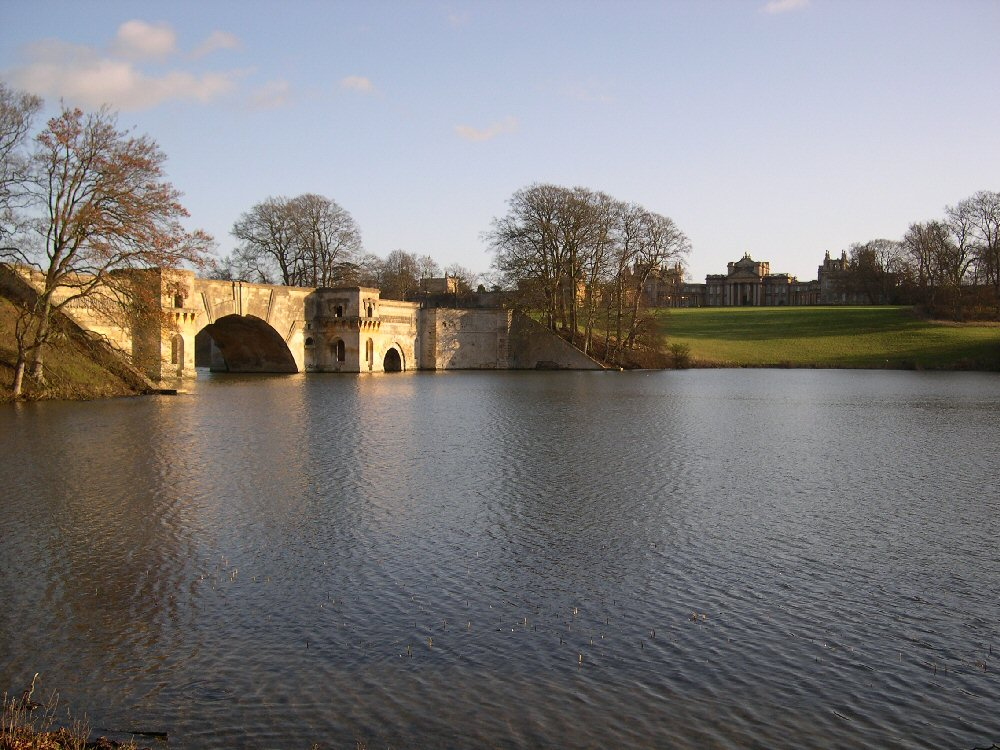
At Blenheim Palace in Oxfordshire, Brown dammed the paltry stream flowing under Vanbrugh's Grand Bridge, drowning half the structure with improved results

=== Criticism ===
Perhaps Brown's sternest critic was his contemporary Uvedale Price, who likened Brown's clumps of trees to "so many puddings turned out of one common mould." Russell Page, who began his career in the Brownian landscape of Longleat but whose own designs have formal structure, accused Brown of "encouraging his wealthy clients to tear out their splendid formal gardens and replace them with his facile compositions of grass, tree clumps and rather shapeless pools and lakes."

Richard Owen Cambridge, the English poet and satirical author, declared that he hoped to die before Brown so that he could "see heaven before it was 'improved'." This deftness of touch was recognised in his own day; one anonymous obituary writer opined: "Such, however, was the effect of his genius that when he was the happiest man, he will be least remembered; so closely did he copy nature that his works will be mistaken." In 1772, Sir William Chambers (though he did not mention Brown by name) complained that the "new manner" of gardens "differ very little from common fields, so closely is vulgar nature copied in most of them."

== Architecture ==
Capability Brown produced more than 100 architectural drawings, and his work in the field of architecture was a natural outgrowth of his unified picture of the English country house in its setting:

"In Brown's hands the house, which before had dominated the estate, became an integral part of a carefully composed landscape intended to be seen through the eye of a painter, and its design could not be divorced from that of the garden"

Humphry Repton observed that Brown "fancied himself an architect", but Brown's work as an architect is overshadowed by his great reputation as a designer of landscapes. Repton was bound to add: "He was inferior to none in what related to the comfort, convenience, taste and propriety of design, in the several mansions and other buildings which he planned". Brown's first country house project was the remodelling of Croome Court, Worcestershire, (1751–52) for the 6th Earl of Coventry, in which instance he was likely following sketches by the gentleman amateur Sanderson Miller.

Fisherwick, Staffordshire, Redgrave Hall, Suffolk, and Claremont, Surrey, were classical, while at Corsham his outbuildings are in a Gothic vein, including the bathhouse. Gothic stable blocks and decorative outbuildings, arches and garden features constituted many of his designs. From 1771 he was assisted in the technical aspects by the master builder Henry Holland, and by Henry's son Henry Holland the architect, whose initial career Brown supported; the younger Holland was increasingly Brown's full collaborator and became Brown's son-in-law in 1773.

== Subsequent reputation ==
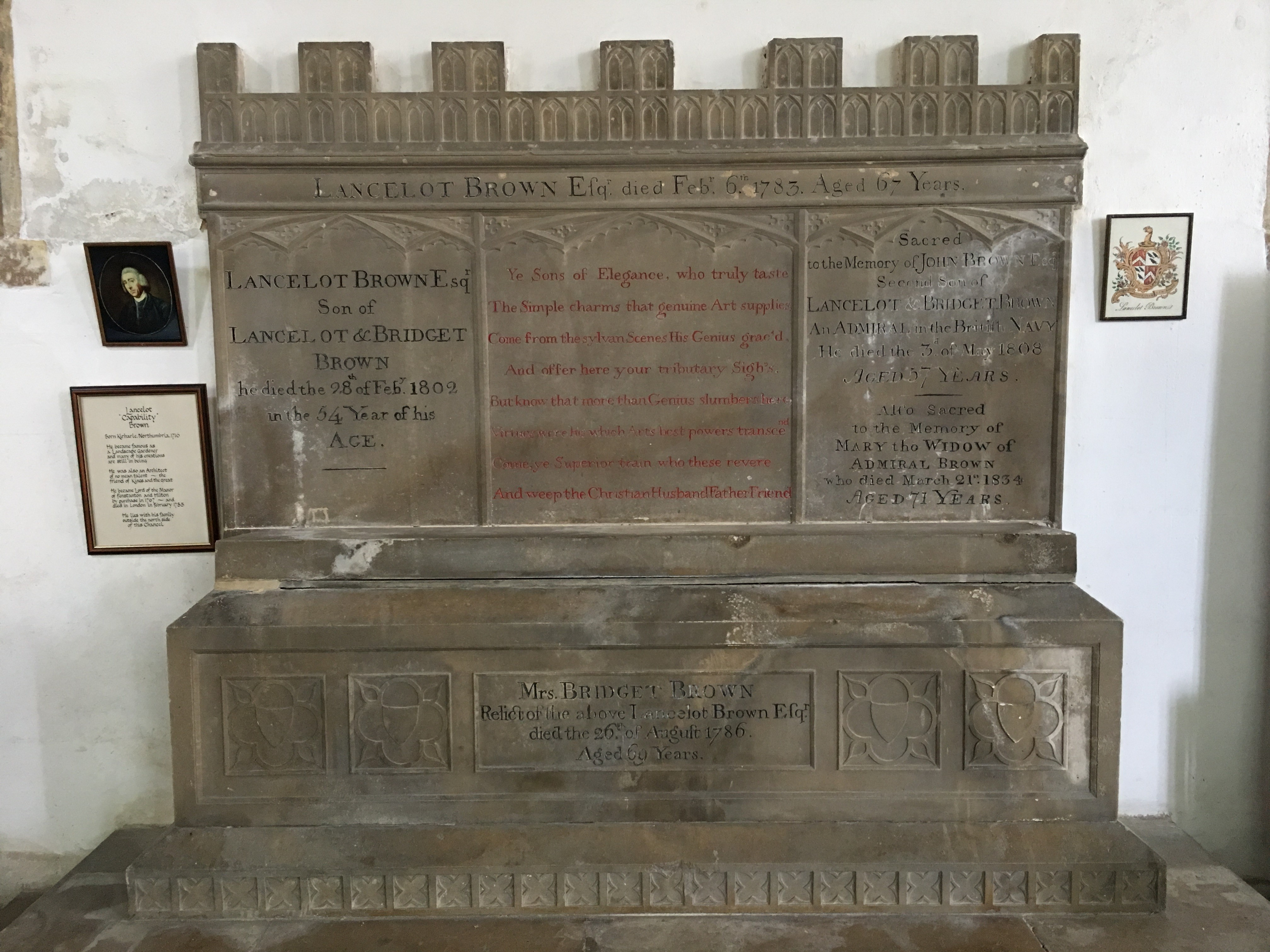
Memorial to Capability Brown in the church of St Peter and St Paul, Fenstanton, Cambridgeshire

Brown's reputation declined rapidly after his death, because the English landscape style did not convey the dramatic conflict and awesome power of wild nature. A reaction against the harmony and calmness of Brown's landscapes was inevitable; the landscapes lacked the sublime thrill which members of the Romantic generation (such as Richard Payne Knight and Uvedale Price) looked for in their ideal landscape, where the painterly inspiration would come from Salvator Rosa rather than Claude Lorrain.

During the 19th century he was widely criticised, but during the twentieth century his reputation rose again. Tom Turner has suggested that the latter resulted from a favourable account of his talent in Marie-Luise Gothein's History of Garden Art which predated Christopher Hussey's positive account of Brown in The Picturesque (1927). Dorothy Stroud wrote the first full monograph on Capability Brown, fleshing out the generic attributions with documentation from country house estate offices.

Later landscape architects like William Sawrey Gilpin would opine that Brown's 'natural curves' were as artificial as the straight lines that were common in French gardens. Brown's portrait by Nathaniel Dance, c. 1773, is conserved in the National Portrait Gallery, London. His work has often been favourably compared and contrasted ("the antithesis") to the œuvre of André Le Nôtre, the French jardin à la française landscape architect. He became both "rich and honoured and had 'improved' a greater acreage of ground than any landscape architect" who preceded him.

A festival to celebrate the tercentenary of Brown's birth was held in 2016. The Capability Brown Festival 2016 published a large amount of new research on Brown's work and held over 500 events across Britain as part of the celebrations. Royal Mail issued a series of Landscape Stamps in his honour in August 2016.

The Gardens Trust, with support from Historic England, published Vulnerability Brown: Capability Brown landscapes at risk in October 2017 to review the issues facing the survival of these landscapes as well as suggested solutions.

A commemorative fountain in Westminster Abbey's cloister garth was dedicated for Lancelot 'Capability' Brown after Evensong on Tuesday 29 May 2018 by the Dean of Westminster, Dr John Hall. The fountain sits over an old monastic well in the garth. It was designed by Ptolemy Dean, the Abbey's Surveyor of the Fabric, and was developed with the assistance of gardener Alan Titchmarsh. The fountain was made in lead by sculptor Brian Turner.

== Personal life ==
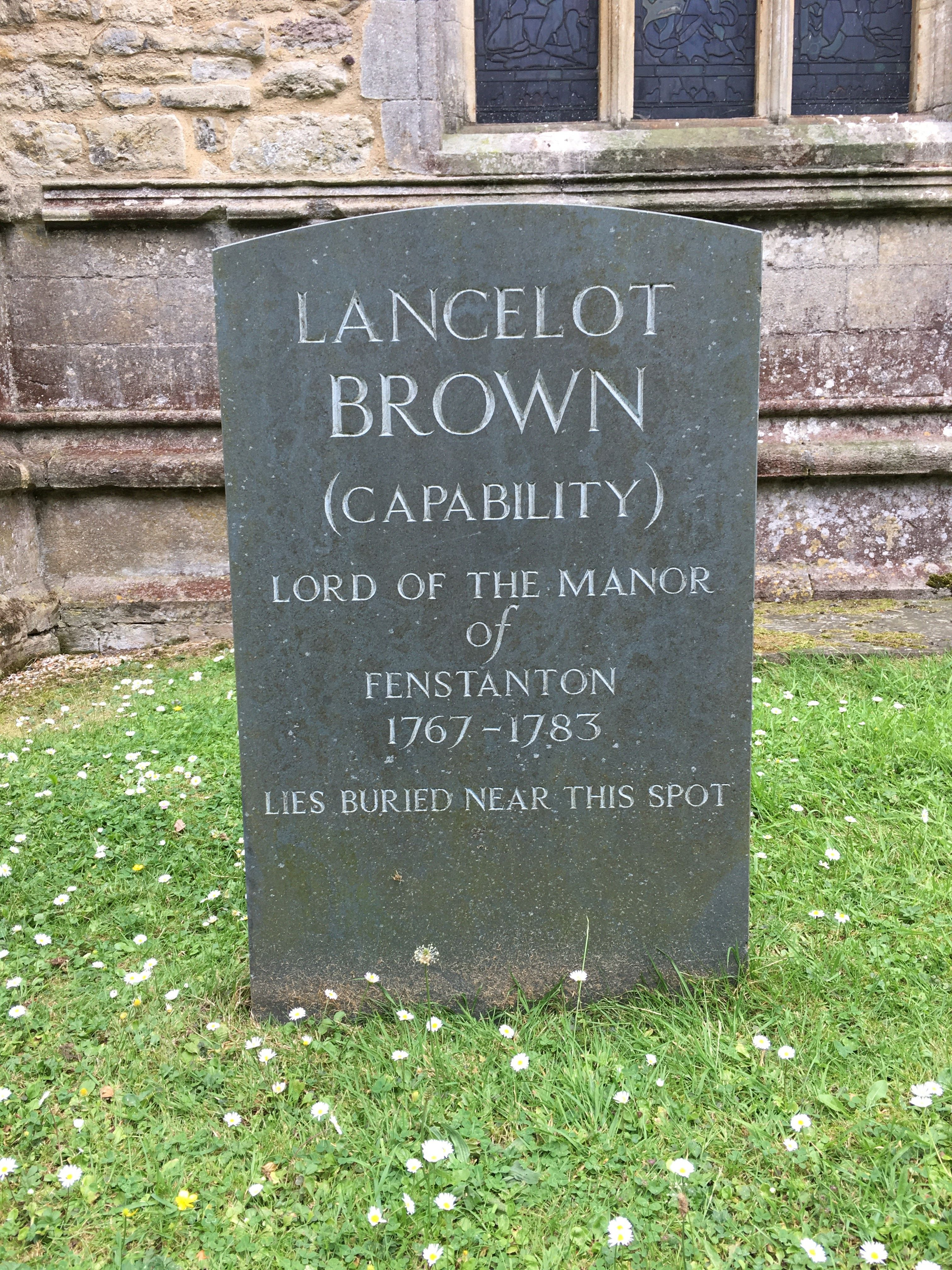
The grave of Capability Brown in the churchyard of St Peter and St Paul, Fenstanton, Cambridgeshire

On 22 November 1744 he married Bridget Wayet (affectionately called Biddy) from Boston, Lincolnshire, in Stowe parish church. Her father was an alderman and landowner while her family had surveyors and engineers among its members. They had eight children: Bridget in 1746, Lancelot (known as Lance), William (who died young), John in 1751, a son in 1754 who died shortly afterwards, Anne who was born and died in 1756, Margaret (known as Peggy) in 1758, and Thomas in 1761.

In 1768 he purchased the manor of Fenstanton in Huntingdonshire in East Anglia for £13,000 (equivalent to £1,900,000 in 2025) from Lord Northampton. This came with two manor houses, two villages and 2,668 acres of land. The property stayed in the family until it was sold in lots in 1870s and 1880s. Ownership of the property allowed him to stand for and serve as High sheriff of Huntingdonshire from 1770 to 1771. He continued to work and travel until his sudden collapse and death on 6 February 1783, on the doorstep of his daughter Bridget Holland's house, at 6 Hertford Street, London while returning after a night out at Lord Coventry's.

Horace Walpole wrote to Lady Ossory: "Your dryads must go into black gloves, Madam, their father-in-law, Lady Nature's second husband, is dead!". Brown was buried in the churchyard of St. Peter and St. Paul, the parish church of Brown's small estate at Fenstanton Manor. He left an estate of approximately £40,000 (equivalent to £5,210,000 in 2025), which included property in Cambridgeshire, Huntingdonshire and Lincolnshire. His eldest daughter Bridget married the architect Henry Holland. Brown sent two of his sons to Eton. One of them, Lancelot Brown the younger, became the MP for Huntingdon. His son John joined the Royal Navy and rose to become an admiral.

== Gardens and parks ==
Many of Capability Brown's parks and gardens may still be visited today. A partial list of the landscapes he designed or worked on includes:

- Adderbury House, Oxfordshire (designs not thought to be implemented)
- Addington Place, Croydon
- Alnwick Castle, Northumberland
- Althorp, Northamptonshire
- Ampthill Park, Ampthill, Bedfordshire
- Ancaster House, Richmond, Surrey
- Appuldurcombe House, Isle of Wight
- Ashburnham Place, East Sussex
- Ashridge House, Hertfordshire
- Aske Hall, North Yorkshire
- Astrop Park, Northamptonshire
- Audley End, Essex
- Aynhoe Park, Northamptonshire
- The Backs, Cambridge
- Badminton House, Gloucestershire
- Ballyfin House, Ireland
- Basildon Park, Berkshire
- Battle Abbey, East Sussex
- Beaudesert, Staffordshire
- Beechwood, Bedfordshire
- Belhus, Essex
- Belvoir Castle, Leicestershire
- Benham, Berkshire
- Benwell Tower, near Newcastle upon Tyne
- Berrington Hall, Herefordshire
- Blenheim Palace, Oxfordshire
- Bowood House, Wiltshire
- Branches Park, Cowlinge, Suffolk
- Brentford, Ealing
- Brightling Park, East Sussex
- Broadlands, Hampshire
- Brocklesby Hall, Lincolnshire
- Burghley House, Cambridgeshire
- Burton Constable Hall, East Riding of Yorkshire
- Burton Park, West Sussex
- Burton Pynsent House, Somerset
- Byram, West Yorkshire
- Cadland, Hampshire
- Capheaton Hall, Northumberland
- Chillingham Castle, Northumberland
- Cardiff Castle, Cardiff
- Castle Ashby House, Northamptonshire
- Caversham Park, Berkshire
- Chalfont House, Buckinghamshire
- Charlecote, Warwickshire
- Charlton, Wiltshire
- Chatsworth, Derbyshire
- Chilham Castle, Kent
- Chillington Hall, West Midlands
- Church Stretton Old Rectory, Shropshire
- Clandon Park, Surrey
- Claremont, Surrey
- Clumber Park, Nottinghamshire
- Compton Verney, Warwickshire
- Coombe Abbey, Coventry
- Corsham Court, Wiltshire
- Croome Park, Worcestershire
- Dodington Park, Gloucestershire
- Danson Park, Bexley Borough of London
- Darley Abbey Park, Derby
- Ditchingham Hall, Ditchingham, Norfolk
- Euston Hall, Suffolk
- Farnborough Hall, Warwickshire
- Fawley Court, Oxfordshire
- Gatton Park, Surrey
- Grimsthorpe Castle, Lincolnshire
- Hampton Court Palace, Surrey
- Harewood House, Leeds
- Heveningham Hall, Suffolk
- Highclere Castle, Hampshire
- Highcliffe Castle, Dorset
- Himley Hall, Staffordshire
- Holkham Hall, Norfolk
- Holland Park, London
- The Hoo, Hertfordshire
- Hornby Castle, North Yorkshire
- Howsham, near York
- Ickworth, Suffolk
- Ingestre, Staffordshire
- Ingress Abbey, Kent
- Kelston, Somerset
- Kew Gardens, South West London
- Kiddington Hall, Oxfordshire
- Kimberley, Norfolk
- Kimbolton Castle, Cambridgeshire
- King's Weston House, Bristol
- Kirkharle Hall, Northumberland
- Kirtlington, Oxfordshire
- Knowsley Hall, near Liverpool
- Kyre Park, Herefordshire
- Lacock Abbey, Wiltshire
- Laleham Abbey, Surrey
- Langley, Berkshire
- Langley Park, Buckinghamshire
- Langley Park, Norfolk
- Latimer Park, Amersham, Buckinghamshire
- Leeds Abbey, Kent
- Littlegrove, Barnet, London
- Lleweni Hall, Clwyd
- Longford Castle, Wiltshire
- Longleat, Wiltshire
- Lowther, Cumbria
- Luton Hoo, Bedfordshire
- Madingley Hall, Cambridgeshire
- Maiden Earley, Berkshire
- Mamhead House, Devon
- Melton Constable Hall, Norfolk
- Milton Abbey, Dorset
- Moccas Court, Herefordshire
- Moor Park, Rickmansworth, Hertfordshire
- Mount Clare, Roehampton, South West London
- Navestock Hall, Essex
- Newnham Paddox, Warwickshire
- Newton Park, Newton St Loe, Somerset
- New Wardour Castle, Wiltshire
- North Cray Place, near Sidcup, Bexley, London
- North Stoneham Park, Eastleigh, Hampshire
- Nuneham House, Nuneham Courtney, Oxfordshire
- Oakley, Shropshire
- Packington Park, Warwickshire
- Paddenswick Manor, West London
- Patshull Hall, Staffordshire
- Paultons Park, Hampshire
- Peper Harow House, Surrey
- Peterborough House, Hammersmith, London
- Petworth House, West Sussex
- Pishiobury, Hertfordshire
- Porter's Park, Hertfordshire
- Prior Park, Somerset
- Ragley Hall, Warwickshire
- Redgrave Park, Suffolk
- Roche Abbey, South Yorkshire
- Sandleford, Berkshire
- Savernake Forest, Wiltshire
- Schloss Richmond (Richmond Palace) in Braunschweig, Germany
- Scampston Hall, North Yorkshire
- Sheffield Park, East Sussex
- Sherborne Castle, Dorset
- Sledmere House, East Riding of Yorkshire
- Southill Park, Bedfordshire
- South Stoneham House, Southampton, Hampshire
- Stoke Park, Buckinghamshire
- Stowe Landscape Garden
- Syon House, West London
- Temple Newsam, Leeds
- Thorndon Hall, Essex
- Trentham Gardens, Staffordshire
- Ugbrooke Park, Devon
- Wallington, Northumberland
- Warwick Castle, Warwick
- Wentworth Castle, South Yorkshire
- West Hill, Putney, South London
- Weston Park, Staffordshire
- Whitehall, London
- Whitley Beaumont, West Yorkshire
- Widdicombe Park, near Slapton, Devon
- Wimbledon House, South West London
- Wimbledon Park, South West London
- Wimpole Hall, Cambridgeshire
- Woburn Abbey, Bedfordshire
- Wolterton Hall, Norfolk
- Woodchester, Gloucestershire
- Woodside, Berkshire
- Wootton Place Rectory, Oxfordshire
- Wotton, Buckinghamshire
- Wrest Park, Bedfordshire
- Wrotham Park, Hertfordshire
- Wycombe Abbey, Buckinghamshire
- Wynnstay, Clwyd, Wales
- Youngsbury, Hertfordshire

More than 30 of the gardens are open to the public.

== See also ==
- Ha-ha
- Landscape architecture
