= George Lloyd, 1st Baron Lloyd =

British Conservative politician (1879–1941)

The Right Honourable The Lord Lloyd GCSI GCIE DSO PC
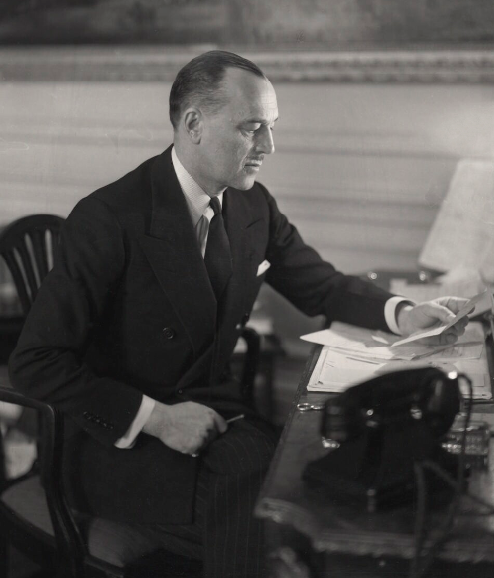
- Lloyd in 1934

Leader of the House of Lords
- In office 22 December 1940 – 4 February 1941
- Monarch: George VI
- Prime Minister: Winston Churchill
- Preceded by: The Viscount Halifax
- Succeeded by: The Lord Moyne

Secretary of State for the Colonies
- In office 12 May 1940 – 4 February 1941
- Monarch: George VI
- Prime Minister: Winston Churchill
- Preceded by: Malcolm MacDonald
- Succeeded by: The Lord Moyne

High Commissioner in Egypt
- In office 1925–1929
- Monarch: George V
- Preceded by: The Viscount Allenby
- Succeeded by: Sir Percy Loraine, Bt

Governor of Bombay
- In office 16 December 1918 – 8 December 1923
- Monarch: George V
- Preceded by: The Marquess of Willingdon
- Succeeded by: Sir Leslie Wilson

Member of the House of Lords
- Lord Temporal
- In office 16 November 1925 – 4 February 1941
- Preceded by: Peerage created
- Succeeded by: The 2nd Baron Lloyd

Member of Parliament for Eastbourne
- In office 29 October 1924 – 15 November 1925
- Preceded by: Rupert Gwynne
- Succeeded by: Sir Reginald Hall

Member of Parliament for West Staffordshire
- In office 10 February 1910 – 14 December 1918
- Preceded by: Henry McLaren
- Succeeded by: constituency abolished

Personal details
- Born: 19 September 1879 Olton Hall, Warwickshire, England
- Died: 4 February 1941 (aged 61) Marylebone, London, England
- Party: Conservative
- Spouse: Hon. Blanche Lascelles (m. 1911)
- Children: Alexander Lloyd, 2nd Baron Lloyd
- Education: Eton Trinity College, Cambridge

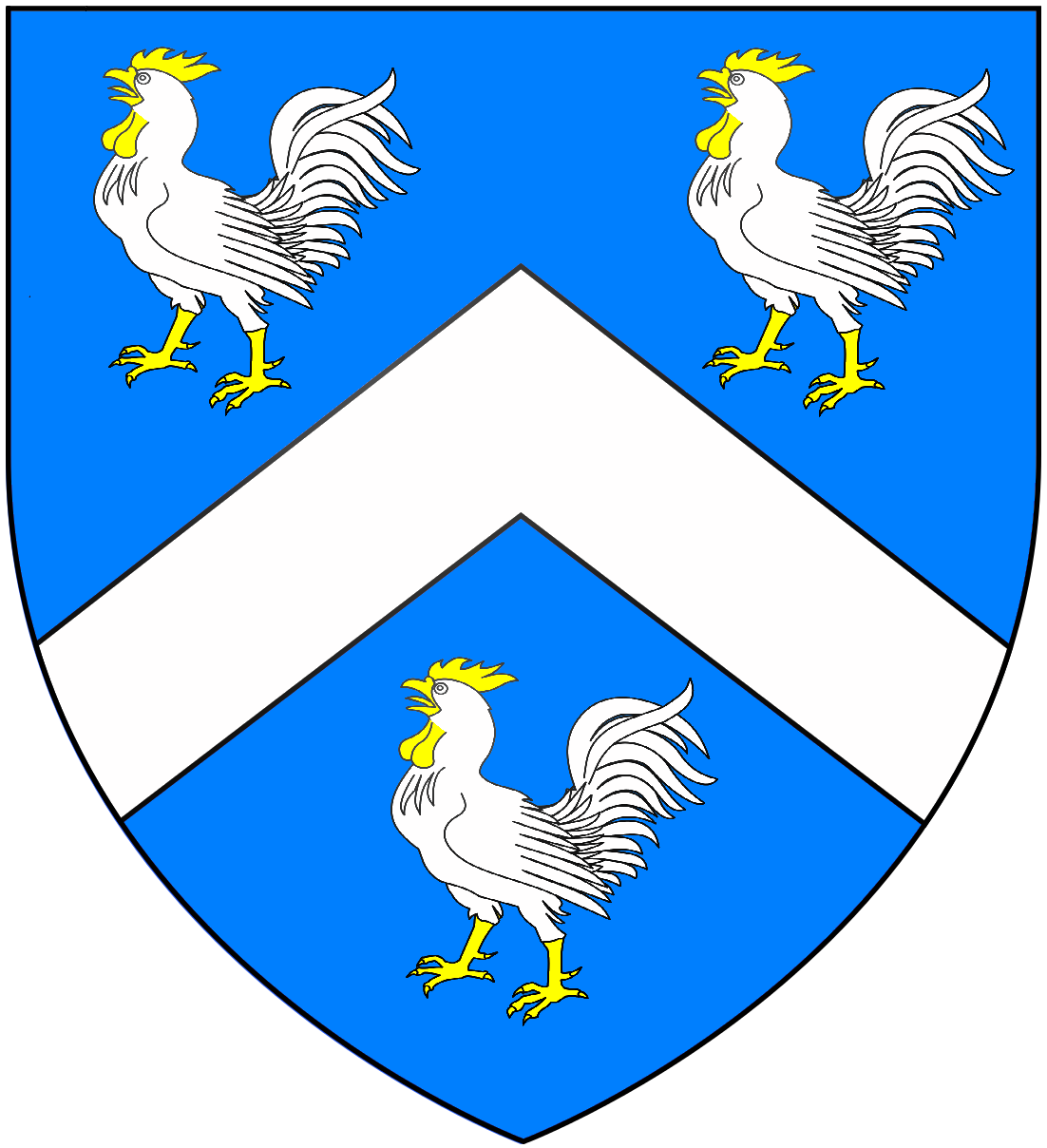
Arms of Lloyd of Dolobran, Montgomeryshire, Wales (of which family had the Lloyd Quakers, bankers and steel manufacturers of Birmingham): Azure, a chevron between three cocks argent armed crested and wattled or

George Ambrose Lloyd, 1st Baron Lloyd (19 September 1879 – 4 February 1941), was a British Conservative politician and colonial administrator who was strongly associated with the "Diehard" wing of the party. From 1937 to 1941, he was chairman of the British Council in which capacity he sought to ensure support for Britain's position during the Second World War.

== Early life ==
Lloyd was born at Olton Hall, Warwickshire, the son of Sampson Samuel Lloyd (whose namesake father was also a Member of Parliament) and Jane Emilia, daughter of Thomas Lloyd. He was educated at Eton and Trinity College, Cambridge. He coxed the Cambridge crew in the 1899 and 1900 Boat Races. He left without taking a degree, was unsettled by the deaths of both his parents in 1899 and made a tour of India.

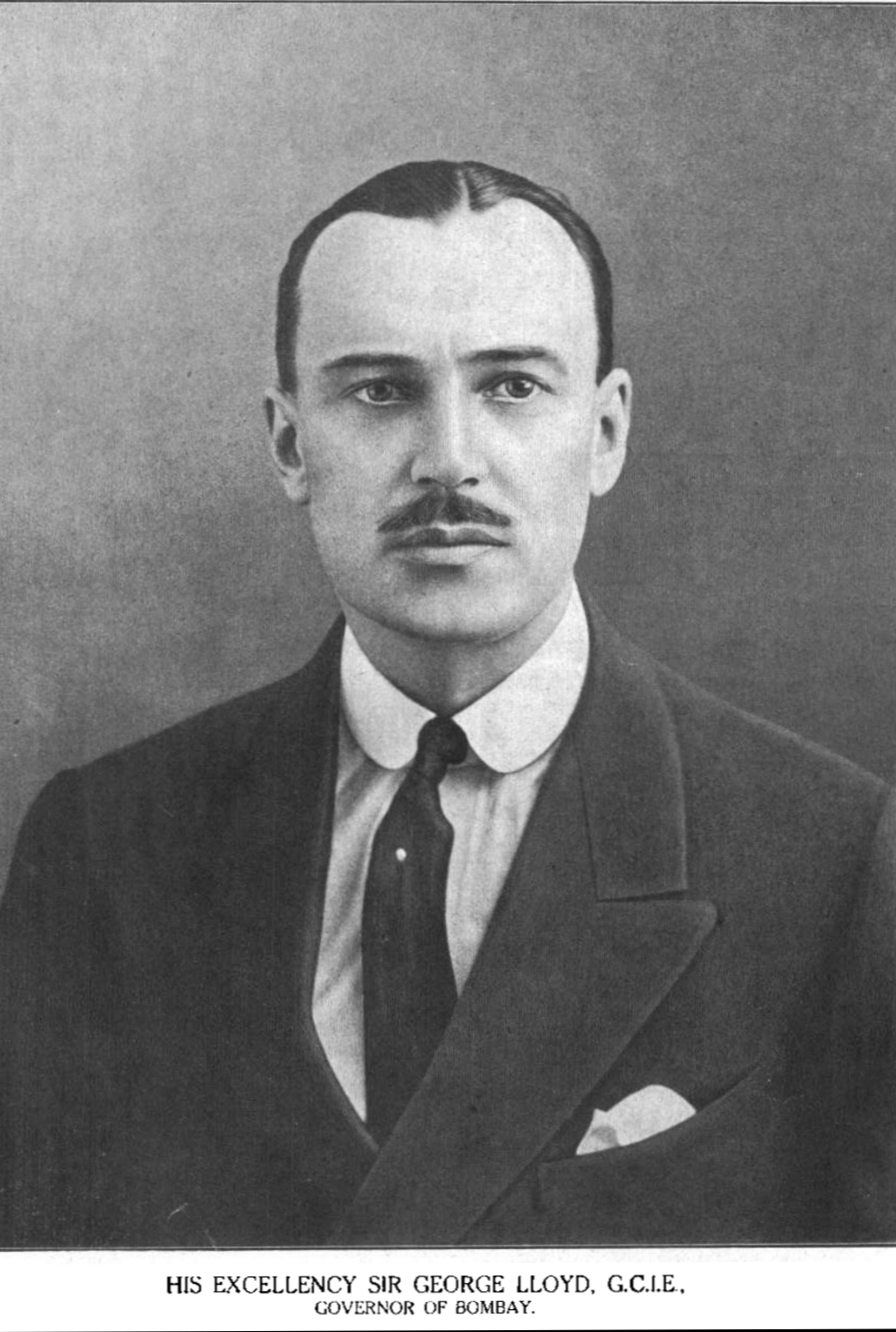

In 1901, Lloyd joined the family firm Stewarts & Lloyds as its youngest director. In 1903, he first became involved with the tariff reform movement of Joseph Chamberlain. In 1904, he fell in love with Lady Constance Knox, daughter of the 5th Earl of Ranfurly, who forbade the match with his daughter considering him unsuitable (she then married Evelyn Milnes Gaskell, son of the Right Honourable Charles Gaskell, in November 1905). In 1905, he turned down an offer by Stewarts & Lloyds of a steady position in London and chose to embark on a study of the East in the British Empire.

=== Foreign Office ===
Through the efforts of his friends Samuel Pepys Cockerell, working in the commercial department of the Foreign Office, and Gertrude Bell, whom he had come to know, he started work as an unpaid honorary attaché in Constantinople. At "Old Stamboul", as he came to remember the Embassy of Sir Nicholas O'Conor, he worked together with Lancelot Oliphant, Percy Loraine and Alexander Cadogan. There also, he first met Mark Sykes and Aubrey Herbert. In April 1906, Herbert joined him on an exploration of the state of the Baghdad Railway. His confidential memorandum of November 1906 on the Hejaz Railway gave a detailed account of many economic problems. That and other papers on Ottoman finance, for example, led to his appointment in January 1907 as a special commissioner to investigate trading prospects around the Persian Gulf.

=== Parliamentary candidate ===
Lloyd had been strongly influenced by Joseph Chamberlain's call for tariff reform to link Britain and the dominions closer together, and the tariff issue now inspired Lloyd to enter politics. At the January 1910 general election, Lloyd was elected as a Liberal Unionist Member of Parliament (MP) for West Staffordshire. He married Blanche Lascelles the following year. In February 1914, Lloyd was adopted as Unionist parliamentary candidate for Shrewsbury ahead of the next general election (expected no later than the end of 1915) when the sitting MP, the unrelated namesake George Butler Lloyd, intended to retire. Lloyd was completely opposed to women's suffrage and wrote that to give women the right to vote would ensure that they would vote "for the beaux yeux of the candidates".

The general election and his candidacy were both forestalled by the outbreak of the First World War, and the sitting member continued to hold his seat until 1922. He and another backbench colleague in Parliament, Leopold Amery, lobbied the Conservative leadership to press for an immediate declaration of war against Germany on 1 August 1914.

In conjunction with Edward Wood (later Earl of Halifax), Lloyd wrote The Great Opportunity in 1918. The book was meant to be a Conservative challenge to the Lloyd George coalition and stressed for devolution of power from Westminster and the importance of reviving English industry and agriculture.

=== First World War ===
As a lieutenant in the Warwickshire Yeomanry, Lloyd was called up three days after Britain had entered the war.

During the war, he served on the staff of Sir Ian Hamilton at Gallipoli and landed with the ANZACs on the first day of that campaign; took part in a special British mission to Petrograd to improve Anglo-Russian liaison; visited Basra to update his study of commerce in the Persian Gulf; and, after a time in Cairo, with T. E. Lawrence and the Arab Bureau in Hejaz, the Negev and the Sinai Desert. He reached the rank of captain in the Warwickshire Yeomanry in which regiment he continued to hold rank until 1925, he was awarded the Distinguished Service Order and made Companion of the Indian Empire in 1917. For services in the war, he also received the Russian Empire's Order of St Anne, 3rd Class, and the Order of Al Nahda (2nd class) of the Kingdom of Hejaz.

== Colonial posts ==
=== Bombay ===
In December 1918 he was appointed Governor of Bombay and made Knight Commander in the Order of the Indian Empire. His principal activities as governor were reclaiming land for housing in the Back Bay area of the city of Bombay and building the Lloyd Barrage (now Sukkur Barrage) an irrigation scheme, both of which were funded by loans raised in India, instead of in England. Lloyd's administration was the first to raise such funds locally. His province was one of the centres of Indian nationalist unrest to deal with which he insisted in 1921 on the arrest of Mahatma Gandhi, who was subsequently imprisoned for six years for sedition.

Lloyd was very strongly opposed to Indian independence or even bringing a measure of democracy to the Raj and wrote of what he called "the fundamental unsuitability of modern western democratic methods of government to any Oriental people". A strong believer in what he regarded as the greatness of the British Empire, Lloyd wrote from Bombay to a friend on 25 August 1920: "The real truth is that we can't withdraw the legions: every schoolboy knows what happened to Rome as the legions began to do so". The British historian Louise Atherton described Lloyd: "Idealistically, almost mystically, devoted to the British Empire, he advocated the use of force, if necessary, to maintain British control". He completed his term as governor in 1923 and was made a Privy Counsellor and Knight Grand Commander of the Order of the Star of India.

He was instrumental in selecting and sending the first truly-Indian team of athletes to Olympics in 1920 to the 7th Olympic Games, held at Antwerp, Belgium. He helped form the ad hoc Indian Olympic Association under the chairmanship of the industrialist and philanthropist Sir Dorabji Tata. Lloyd made special arrangements for the preparations and training of the six-member team in England, arranged for their travel and stayed in military facilities both in London and then Antwerp. He negotiated the arrangements with Sir Winston Churchill and got the required permissions even when the Britain was broke from the First World War and struggling even to send its own teams to the Games. A patron of the Bhandarkar Oriental Research Institute, he also established an annual grant dedicated to its efforts in producing a critical edition of the Hindu epic Mahabharata.

=== Egypt ===
He returned to Parliament again for Eastbourne in 1924 and served until 1925, when he was made Baron Lloyd, of Dolobran in the County of Montgomery, named after his Welsh ancestral home. After his ennoblement, he was appointed High Commissioner to Egypt and served until his resignation was forced upon him by the Labour Foreign Secretary Arthur Henderson in 1929. Lloyd's views and experience formed the background of a self-justifying two-volume book, Egypt Since Cromer (published 1933–1934).

=== Lobbying ===
In 1930, Lloyd became president of the Navy League, which lobbied the government for to spend more money on the Royal Navy, and he was a member of the India Defence League, which lobbied the government not to grant home rule to India. During the 1930s, he was one of the most prominent opponents of proposals to grant Indian Home Rule, working alongside Winston Churchill against the National Government. From 1931 to 1935, Lloyd employed James Lees-Milne as one of his male secretaries.

Lloyd was suspicious of Adolf Hitler and the Nazi movement, which he saw as a threat to Britain. He agitated for rearmament against Germany as early as 1930, before Churchill did so.

== British Council ==
From July 1937 onward, he was chairman of the British Council in which he oversaw an increase in lectureships and made cultural tours of neutral capitals to maintain sympathy for Britain's cause during the early months of the Second World War.

The council was a purportedly-independent group meant to engage in cultural propaganda promoting the British way of life to the rest of the world that was in fact under the control of the Foreign Office. As head of the British Council, Lloyd ran his own private intelligence network that employed as one his spies the journalist Ian Colvin, who served as the Berlin correspondent of The News Chronicle. Unusually, Lloyd enjoyed a privileged access to the secret reports of MI6, the British intelligence service. The British historian D. C. Watt called Lloyd "one of those uncontrollable lusi naturae the British elite throws up from time to time".

In November 1937, Foreign Secretary Anthony Eden instructed Lloyd that the British Council was to concentrate especially on improving Britain's image in Portugal, Greece, Turkey, Yugoslavia, Romania and Poland. Regarding the Middle East, especially Egypt, as a crucial area of control for Britain, Lloyd regarded the approaches to the Near East as equally crucial, which led him to become obsessed with the Balkans, which called the "eastern approaches", independently of Eden's instructions. In April 1938, he suggested in a memo sent to Prime Minister Neville Chamberlain and Foreign Secretary Lord Halifax that Britain needed to become more economically involved in the Balkans, which were rapidly falling into the German economic sphere of influence. After discussing the issue with King George II of Greece during a visit to Athens in May 1938, Lloyd submitted another memo calling for Britain to increase the import of staple goods from Bulgaria, Turkey, Greece and Romania. In response, Britain granted Turkey a credit of £16 million that month, but Lloyd's idea of an "economic offensive" in the Balkans was not taken up at the time.

=== Czechoslovakia ===
Lloyd was not in sympathy with the Chamberlain government's policies towards Czechoslovakia in August–September 1938, and his advice that he gave to his old friend, Lord Halifax, who served as Foreign Secretary after Eden had resigned in February 1938 in protest against the Chamberlain's government's policies towards Fascist Italy, was not followed.

Lloyd passed on to the government on 3 August 1938 a report from Colvin that stated that Germany planned to invade Czechoslovakia on 28 September. In September, Prime Minister Neville Chamberlain flew to Germany three times for summits with Hitler at Berchtesgaden, Bad Godesberg and Munich to discuss the Sudetenland crisis. In a letter of 20 October 1938 to Sir Percy Loraine, Lloyd sardonically wrote of those three summits: "If at first you don't concede, fly, fly again."

=== United States ===
In the tense atmosphere of 1938, Lloyd tried hard to increase British propaganda in the United States to an attempt to involve the America in the Sudetenland dispute and favored an approach of trying to appeal to the American elite, rather than the American people in general.

In June 1938, he argued that the British Council should arrange for British professors to serve as visiting lecturers at American universities to strengthen Anglo-American relations. The same month, the US Congress passed the Foreign Agents Registration Act, which required all propaganda by foreign governments in the United States to be registered with the State Department and to be labelled as propaganda. US Representative Martin Dies Jr., the chairman of the House Committee for the Investigation of Un-American Activities (HUAC), announced his committee would be investigating British attempts to get the United States involved in European conflicts. He alleged that the only reason that the United States had declared war on Germany in 1917 was because of improper British propaganda, and he vowed his country would not be "tricked" again into declaring war on Germany. In response to the xenophobic mood in Congress, the British ambassador in Washington, Sir Ronald Lindsay, objected to Lloyd's plans and wrote if the Foreign Office knew "what they were at", it would know that any British Council propaganda in America would offend Congress. Even Lloyd's plans to use the British Pavilion at the upcoming 1939 New York World's Fair to promote the British viewpoint drew objections from Lindsay that it would upset Congress. Lindsay regarded Dies as a particular problem as the congressman from Texas was known for his grandstanding style and his love of publicity, which led him to make fantastic and often-bizarre statements. As a result of Lindsay's objections, Britain instituted a "no propaganda" policy in the United States, which lasted until 1940. Dies's investigation into British propaganda in America failed to find any, which caused him to turn his attention to Hollywood, where he alleged that too many filmmakers had left-wing and therefore "un-American" views. Dies made headlines by announcing that he found evidence that wealthy Hollywood filmmakers were secretly members of the US Communist Party and were smuggling in Spanish Republican soldiers disguised as illegal immigrants from Mexico with the aim of staging a communist coup, but the subsequent lack of evidence to back up those assertions discredited him.

Lloyd was forced to use a more informal approach to the United States and arranged for Americans with the power to influence American public opinion to visit Britain, where they were met by notable British personalities, who were instructed to impress them the importance of closer Anglo-American ties as a factor for world peace. The Britons recruited for this work were Sir George Schuster, the president of Lipton's Tea; the American-born Conservative MP Ronald Tree; the Scottish aristocrat Lord Lothian, the secretary of the Rhodes Trust; the Labour MP Josiah Wedgwood; Angus Fletcher, the president of the British Library of Information; and Frank Darvall, the president of the English Speaking Union who had received his degree at Columbia University. In particular, American journalists were cultivated with the principle theme being that both countries were champions of freedom and democracy and should work together more closely for that reason. As those meetings took place in Britain with individuals who were ostensibly expressing their own personal views, and the American correspondents in their writings and broadcasts merely recorded their own experiences of Britain, that completely bypassed the Foreign Agents Registration Act.

=== Balkans ===
Accepting that Czechoslovakia was a lost cause after the Munich Agreement, in the autumn of 1938, Lloyd focused on convincing the government that greater British involvement was needed with the remaining two members of the Little Entente: Yugoslavia and Romania. Lloyd was especially involved with the latter, where his two principal collaborators were Grigore Gafencu and Virgil Tilea, both of whom he knew from his work with the British Council. In October 1938, Lloyd visited Bucharest to meet King Carol II.supposedly to encourage Anglo-Romanian cultural links but in fact to hear a plan from Carol for Britain to stop Romania from becoming an economic colony of Germany. Lloyd who rather liked Carol, sent a series of vigorously written telegrams from Bucharest urging for Britain to commit itself to spending £500,000 on buying Romanian oil, purchase 600,000 tons of Romanian wheat and assist Romania with building a naval base where the Danube River flowed into the Black Sea. In the cabinet meetings, Lord Halifax used Lloyd's telegrams to argue that Britain should buy Romanian wheat and said that "how urgent the matter is, and of what importance it is without delay to try and do something in the economic sphere for Romania". Chamberlain agreed with the idea, but he committed to buying only 200,000 tons of Romanian wheat after objections from the Treasury.

Lloyd, the most consistent advocate of more British support for Romania, argued to Lord Halifax that it was too dangerous to let that oil-rich kingdom fall into the German sphere of influence. Lloyd noted that Germany had no oil of its own and that there were only two places in Europe where oil could be obtained in massive quantities, the Soviet Union and Romania, and that since the latter was by far the weaker, he believed that Romania would be Hitler's next target. In response, Halifax argued that the Germans saw Romania as being in their sphere of influence, and too great of British involvement in that kingdom would have been seen by Hitler as "encirclement". When Carol visited London between 15 and 18 November 1938, Lloyd was present to argue on his behalf. Despite all of Lloyd's advocacy of Carol's case during his London visit, Britain agreed to buy only 200,000 tons of Romanian wheat at above world prices with an option to buy 400,000 tons but refused the king's request for a £30 million pound loan. The Chamberlain government committed to spending £10 million in support of threatened nations in November 1938, but the bill authorising the spending was not passed until February 1939, of which the largest sum, £3 million, went to China, and in the Balkans £2 million went to Greece and £1 million to Romania.

In a letter on 24 November, he mentioned that he just returned from the Balkans "to see what could be saved in the Balkans from the Nazis", an allusion to the recent tour of Balkans by German Economics Minister Dr Walther Funk, who pressed for greater economic integration of the region with the German Reich. Acting in his own capacity, Lloyd urged that the directors of the firm Spencer Limited to build grain silos in Romania, as Carol had mentioned during his visit to London that Romania's ability to export wheat was hindered by the lack of grain silos. In January 1939, Lloyd advised Gafencu, who just been appointed Romanian Foreign Minister, to appoint someone of "considerable energy and position" to be the Romanian minister in London, which led to Tilea receiving the appointment. After King Carol, the Balkan leader to whom Lloyd was closest was Prince Paul, the Regent of Yugoslavia for the boy King Peter II.

Working with a fellow member of the board of the Navy League, Lord Sempill, who had served as the deputy chairman of the London Chamber of Commence in 1931–1934, Lloyd sought from January 1939 onward to encourage British businesses to buy many products from the Balkans as possible. Lord Semphill had once been an enthusiast for Nazi Germany and had joined the Anglo-German Fellowship, but he was described as being "impressed by Lloyd's propaganda efforts and wanted to back them with specific business arrangements". In February 1939, he visited Athens to meet the Greek dictator, General Ioannis Metaxas, in an effort to improve Anglo-Greek relations. In a bid to "soften the dictatorship", Lloyd arranged for greater British Council involvement with the National Youth Organisation, which he believed would allow the British Council to win over Greek public opinion. During his visit to Athens, Lloyd also advised King George II to dismiss a Germanophile, Metaxas, as prime minister and to appoint an Anglophile as his successor, which the king refused. Lloyd made clear during his Greek visit his personal preference for Venizelism and met several Venizelist Greek politicians, which was also a way of expressing his distaste for the 4th of August Regime. Upon his return from Greece, Lloyd pressed very strongly for the government to force British tobacco companies to buy the Greek tobacco crop. During his visit to Greece, both King George and Mextaxas had told him that Germany had more to offer Greece economically than Britain, which led Lloyd to decide on a dramatic gesture to prove otherwise. Lloyd's advocacy of buying the entire Greek tobacco crop for 1939 led to bureaucratic struggle, as objections were raised that it was unfair to force British smokers to use Greek tobacco, regarded as inferior, when they were used to American and Canadian tobacco, regarded as superior.

=== Second World War ===
On 27 January 1939, Lloyd passed on to the government a report he received from Colvin that Germany was planning to invade Poland in the spring of 1939. In March 1939, Lloyd played a major role in the "Tilea affair" when Tilea claimed that Romania was on the brink of a German invasion, a claim that he strongly endorsed despite the denials of Gafencu. Lloyd argued to Halifax that based upon his sources in Romania, Germany had indeed threatened an invasion, which the Romanians were denying for fear of enraging Hitler. In late March 1939, Lloyd received information from Colvin that Germany was planning on invading Poland that spring, and on 23 March, he told Colvin that he would arrange for him to meet Chamberlain and Lord Halifax. Colvin met Chamberlain and Lord Halifax on 29 March 1939, but it is not clear much credence Lloyd placed on his reports, as on 31 March, the same day that Chamberlain announced the guarantee of Poland in the House of Commons, Lloyd told Halifax that he still regarded Romania, rather than Poland, as Hitler's probable next target.

Lloyd argued that Britain and France should co-ordinate their policies in the Balkans as the best way of deterring Germany and played a major role in ensuring the Anglo-French guarantees of Romania and Greece that were issued on 13 April 1939. After the Italians annexed Albania on 4 April 1939, there was a general consensus within the Chamberlain cabinet that Britain should guarantee Greece, but it was felt that the Romanians should commit to strengthening their alliance with Poland before Britain offered a guarantee of Romania. As the Danzig crisis was just beginning, Carol was reluctant to strengthen the Romanian alliance with Poland. When Tilea told Lloyd that Britain but not France was hesitant to guarantee Romania, Lloyd went to the French embassy. Lloyd was regarded as such an important personality that he barged in as French Ambassador Charles Corbin was on the telephone with Prime Minister Edouard Daladier. Lloyd, who was fluent in French, talked to Daladier and told him that if France held firm in ensuring the guarantees to Romania and Greece, Britain would have to follow suit. As the British government did not wish to be seen operating out of sync with the French, the news that Daladier would go ahead with the guarantee forced London's hand. Atherton wrote about Lloyd's actions in April 1939, "The beneficiary was Romania, who received a guarantee unconditional on a closer defensive alliance with Poland, and which helped her to balance between the western powers, Germany, and Russia. In this instance, Lloyd had been working on behalf of Romania rather than Great Britain". However, Lloyd's attempts to lobby Halifax to issue a guarantee for Yugoslavia fell flat.

Reflecting his special case in the Balkans, when Britain declared war on Germany on 3 September 1939, Lloyd had the pamphlet The British Case to explain why Britain had declared war translated into Greek, Bulgarian, Romanian, Serbo-Croatian and Slovene and ensured that it was widely distributed all over the Balkans. A recurring theme of Lloyd's letters to Halifax during the Phoney War was that the Treasury was not providing enough money for the British Council's work in the Balkans. In September 1939, Tilea began to promote the idea of a "Balkan bloc", consisting of all the Balkan state, that would be committed to upholding neutrality in the Second World War with the understanding that the Allies would come to their aid if their neutrality was violated. Lloyd, who was in close contact with Churchill who was appointed First Lord of the Admiralty on 3 September 1939, called together with Churchill for a "Balkan league", which would form a line to block any German expansion into the Balkans. On 27 September 1939, Tilea asked Sir Alexander Cadogan, the Foreign Office's Permanent Undersecretary, "whether it would not be a good plan to send someone out to Bucharest, and he quoted as an example Lord Lloyd, who had the ear of the King and might be able to give good advice on the subject of Balkan reconciliation and consolidation". It is possible that Lloyd and Tilea had been working together on the same day that Tilea had asked for Lloyd to go to the Balkans. Lloyd had told Lord Halifax of his desire to go the Balkans saying "the urgency of which at the present moment obviously cannot be exaggerated".

=== Balkan tour ===
By October 1939, it was agreed that Lloyd would visit Romania but all of the Balkan states to work for a "Balkan pact". Sir Reginald Hoare, the British minister in Bucharest, was opposed to the plan to send Lloyd to the Balkans, but George William Rendel, the minister in Sofia, and Sir Michael Palairet, the minister in Athens, were supportive. In the interval, Lloyd had visited Spain to ask the Spanish dictator, General Francisco Franco, if he was willing to guarantee the proposed "Balkan pact", an aspect of his visit to Madrid about which he neglected to tell the Foreign Office. The Foreign Office first learned of the plan from the Yugoslav Regent, Prince Paul, in November 1939. On 3 November 1939, Lord Halifax called a meeting to discuss the merits and demerits of the Balkan League plan, which Lloyd was allowed to attend by special permission of Halifax over the objections of Cadogan, who argued that an outsider like Lord Lloyd should be attending a Foreign Office meeting.

On 14 November 1939, Lloyd's Balkan tour began with a visit to Bucharest. Gafencu suggested a "machinery for common action", but negotiations broken down when King Carol learned that the British guarantee of Romania applied only against Germany, not the Soviet Union, as he wanted. As Carol had not seen Hoare for some time, the extended talks that Lord Lloyd had with the king was felt to provide "useful information and impressions". In Belgrade and Sofia, Lloyd's visit was hampered by inability of Britain to supply weapons on the scale that both Prince Paul of Yugoslavia and King Boris III of Bulgaria wanted. Moreover, the unwillingness of Boris to renounce Bulgarian territorial claims over Yugoslavia, Greece and Romania rendered the idea of a neutralist Balkan league impractical. After finishing his Balkan tour, Lloyd went to Syria to see Maxime Weygand, whose Armée de la Syrie had been intended by the French General Staff before the war to go to Thessaloniki.

Upon his return to Britain in December 1939, Lloyd backed French plans for a revival of the Salonika front strategy of World War II and urged at meetings of the Supreme War Council for British and French troops to land at Thessaloniki. In that, he was against the British government, which opposed the French plans for a "second front" in the Balkans under the grounds that it was unclear whether Italy intended to remain neutral or not. Lloyd enlisted the aid of Foreign Office officials such as Robert Bruce Lockhart who summarised his thesis: "Lloyd says that the only argument in the Balkans is strength. If we do nothing we shall lose everything. If we are vigorous we have the support of the Balkans. Therefore, without too much consideration of Italy we must go ahead with the formation of the Near Eastern force". In response to objections from Sir Percy Loraine, the British ambassador in Rome, that he was not certain how long Italy would remain neutral, Lloyd argued that Britain should just ignore the possibility of Italy entering the war but start troops to Thessaloniki at once. At the same time, Lloyd advised Halifax that Britain should start shipping weapons to Yugoslavia at once to indicate that Britain was serious about defending the Balkans. In January 1940, Lloyd wrote to Loraine that Benito Mussolini respected only force and of his belief that if the Allies landed in the Balkans, that was likely to persuade Mussolini to continue Italian neutrality.

=== Evaluation ===
In January 1940, the attention of the Supreme War Council shifted towards Scandinavia, and the Balkan plan was abandoned. Lloyd's major interest in February to March 1940 was in building a "British Institute" in Bucharest to promote British culture, who was supported by Lord Halifax against objections from the Treasury that it was a waste of money in wartime. In an assessment of Lloyd's work in the Balkans, Atherton wrote: "His position was an ambivalent one: neither a diplomat nor a politician, but a peer with a semi-official position and influential political contacts. It was also increasingly irregular, but despite his opposition to the Munich agreement and, after September 1938, to further appeasement of Germany, Chamberlain never sought his removal".

== In cabinet ==
When Churchill became prime minister in May 1940, he appointed Lloyd as Secretary of State for the Colonies and in December, he conferred on Lloyd the additional job of Leader of the House of Lords.

=== London Central Mosque ===
Lord Lloyd was a leading proponent of the future London Central Mosque. As early as 1939 he worked with a Mosque Committee, comprising various prominent Muslims and ambassadors in London. After joining Churchill's cabinet, he sent a memo to Churchill to point out that London contained "more [Muslims] than any other European capital" but that in the British Empire "which actually contains more Moslems (sic) than Christians it was anomalous and inappropriate that there should be no central place of worship for Mussulmans [sic]". He believed the gift of a site for the mosque would serve as "a tribute to the loyalty of the Moslems of the [British] Empire and would have a good effect on Arab countries of the Middle East".

== Other interests ==
In commerce, Lloyd was also director of the British South Africa Company and Wagon Lit Holdings. In peacetime, he habitually travelled in tropical countries every two months.

In his fifties, he trained for and obtained a civil pilot's certificate in 1934, and in 1937, he was appointed Honorary Air Commodore of No 600 (City of London) (Fighter) Squadron of the Auxiliary Air Force with which he insisted on training himself to qualify as a military pilot.

== Personal life ==
In 1911, Lloyd married Blanche Isabella Lascelles, DGStJ, daughter of the Honourable Frederick Canning Lascelles, a Royal Navy commander, and granddaughter of Henry Lascelles, 4th Earl of Harewood. Blanche was a lady-in-waiting to Alexandra of Denmark from 1905 to 1911 and to Mary, Princess Royal and Countess of Harewood (wife of Blanche's first cousin, Henry Lascelles, 6th Earl of Harewood) from 1941 to 1945.

Some in the Foreign Office had thought Lloyd was a homosexual and persisted in that view despite his marriage and the birth of his son.

== Death ==
Lloyd died of myeloid leukaemia at a clinic in Marylebone, London, in February 1941, aged 61, and was buried at St Ippolyts, Hertfordshire. He was succeeded in the barony by his son, Alexander. Lady Lloyd died in December 1969, aged 89.

== In popular culture ==
He appears as the character "Henry Fortescue" in Compton Mackenzie's novel Thin Ice.

== See also ==
- List of Cambridge University Boat Race crews

== Sources ==
- John Charmley, Lord Lloyd and the Decline of the British Empire, Weidenfeld, 1987.
- Atherton, Louise (February 1994), "Lord Lloyd at the British Council and the Balkan Front, 1937–1940", The International History Review, 16 (1): 25–48, doi:10.1080/07075332.1994.9640667
- Goldstein, Erik "Neville Chamberlain, the British Official Mind and the Munich Crisis", pp. 276–292, from The Munich Crisis, Prelude to World War II, edited by Igor Lukes and Erik Goldstein, London: Frank Cass, 1999.

Parliament of the United Kingdom
Preceded by Henry McLaren	Member of Parliament for West Staffordshire; January 1910 – 1918	Constituency abolished
Preceded by Rupert Gwynne	Member of Parliament for Eastbourne; 1924–1925	Succeeded by Reginald Hall
Political offices
Preceded by The Lord Willingdon	Governor of Bombay; 1918–1923	Succeeded by Leslie Wilson
Preceded by The Viscount Allenby	British High Commissioner in Egypt; 1925–1929	Succeeded by Sir Percy Loraine
Preceded by Malcolm MacDonald	Secretary of State for the Colonies; 1940–1941	Succeeded by The Lord Moyne
Preceded by The Viscount Halifax	Leader of the House of Lords; 1940–1941	Succeeded by The Lord Moyne
Party political offices
Preceded by The Viscount Halifax	Leader of the Conservative Party in the House of Lords; 1940–1941	Succeeded by The Lord Moyne
Peerage of the United Kingdom
New creation	Baron Lloyd; 1925–1941; Member of the House of Lords (1925–1941)	Succeeded by Alexander Lloyd
