= Kirkharle =

Village in Northumberland, England

Coordinates: 55.137°N 1.978°W

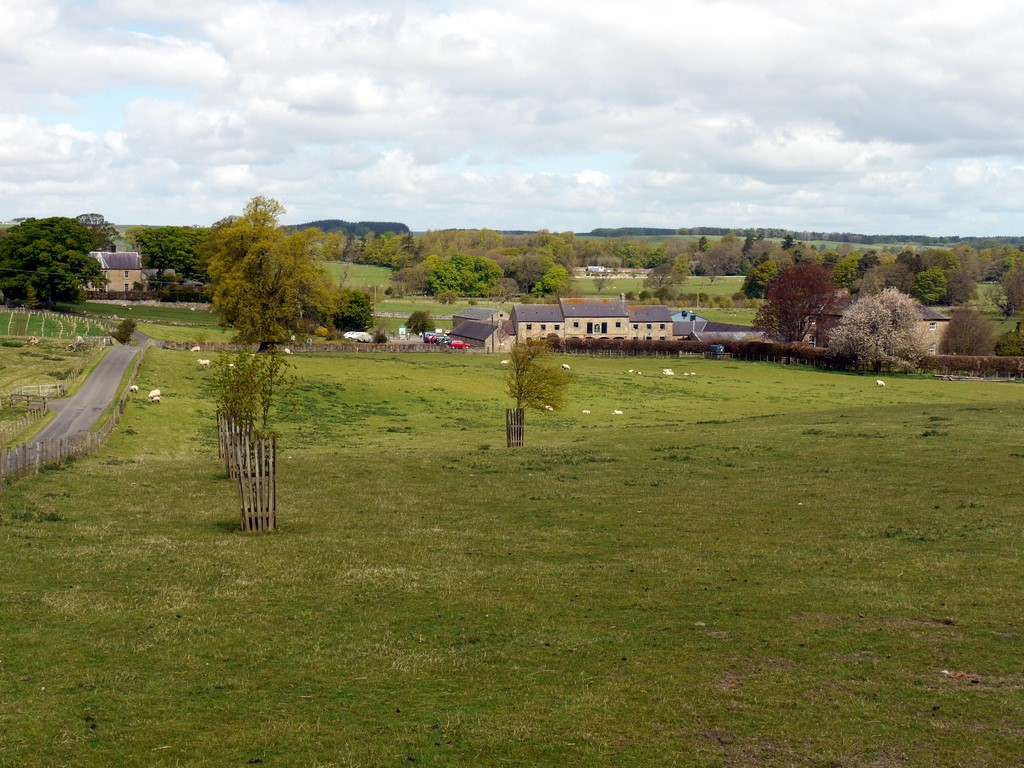
- Kirkharle

- Location within Northumberland
- OS grid reference: NZ015825
- Civil parish: Kirkwhelpington
- Unitary authority: Northumberland
- Ceremonial county: Northumberland
- Region: North East
- Country: England
- Sovereign state: United Kingdom
- Post town: MORPETH
- Postcode district: NE61
- Dialling code: 01830
- Police: Northumbria
- Fire: Northumberland
- Ambulance: North East
- UK Parliament: Hexham

Kirkharle (otherwise Kirk Harle) is a village and former civil parish, now in the parish of Kirkwhelpington, in the county of Northumberland in Northern England located about 12 miles (19 km) west of the town of Morpeth, just to the west of the crossroads of the A696 and B6342 roads. It is famous as the birthplace of Lancelot 'Capability' Brown in the early eighteenth century, Britain's most celebrated landscape gardener. In 1951 the parish had a population of 69.

== Governance ==
On 1 April 1958 the parish was abolished and merged with Kirkwhelpington.

== Landmarks ==
Kirkharle Hall was a country house at Kirkharle, the former seat of the Loraine family, now much reduced and in use as a farmhouse. The estate church is dedicated to St Wilfrid (634-709AD) and is Grade I listed, with most of the building dating from 1336.

A mile to the north of Kirkharle is Little Harle Tower, an 18th and 19th century mansion which incorporates a 15th or 16th century pele tower.

Kirkharle Courtyard now operates as a Visitor Centre focusing on Capability Brown.

== Religious sites ==
Before the village gained the kirk (church) element it was called Herle (recorded 1177) . Herle comes from the Old English "Herela-lea" which means "Herela's Grove" or "herg-leah" which means "temple-grove", a place of worship for the pre-Christian Angles. Other early forms included Kyrkeherle (c.1250), Kyrkherll (1346) and Kirkehirle (1428).

The current church, dedicated to St Wilfrid, was built in the fourteenth century. Among the quaint epitaphs in the church upon departed Loraines is the following:

Here lyes the Body of Richard Loraine, Esq., who was a proper handsome man of good sense and behaviour : he dy'd a Batcheler of an Appoplexy walking in a green field near London, October 26th, 1738, in the 38 Year of his Age.

The Loraine Baronets acquired it by marriage the manor from the De Harles who owned it in the 14th century, and derived their name (literally "of Harle") from the village. In 1836 the Loraine family sold Kirkharle and the main house was pulled down.

== Lancelot 'Capability' Brown ==
Kirkharle's most famous resident is Capability Brown, the notable landscape gardener.

Lancelot ‘Capability’ Brown (bapt.1716 -1783) was born in Kirkharle and baptised in St Wilfrid's Church, Kirkharle, on 30 August 1716. His actual birthdate is not known. He was the fifth of the six children of William Brown, a yeoman farmer and Ursula, née Hall, who had also worked in the big house on the Kirkharle estate.

Lancelot attended the village school in nearby Cambo until the age of 16. In 1732, the young Brown began work at the Kirkharle estate, learning many skills in gardening, planting and land reclamation, leaving to further his career in 1739.

Sir William Loraine, 4th Baronet, inherited the estate in 1755 aged 6 and when he came of age, Brown produced a design plan for him to replace the early 18th century formal gardens with a more naturalistic landscape, probably around 1770. Brown's scheme included single trees, tree belts, a serpentine lake and a new approach, but was only partially implemented. The lake was not created, only part of the semi-circular approach was laid out, and the walled garden may not have been built.

Brown's original plan was rediscovered by Kirkharle's current owners, John and Kitty Anderson, in 1980. They made plans to restore the Grade II-listed park and to recreate Brown's vision for the landscape, including creating his proposed lake. It was not possible to create the lake as one piece of water because the A696 road, built in 1883, now cuts across the bottom of the park so in 2009, two serpentine lakes were created instead. Hundreds of new trees were planted. A cascade, a feature often used by Brown to make two lakes appear as single sheet of water was added in 2016 as part of the Capability Brown Festival, celebrating the tercentenary of Brown's birth. The water began to trickle through the cascade on 30 August 2016, the 300th anniversary of Brown's baptism at St Wilfrid's Church.

The lake, grounds and St Wilfrid's church are open to the public as part of the Kirkharle Courtyard Visitor Centre.

== Other notable people ==
The artist and fox hunter Charles Loraine Smith was born to a Loraine and adopted the name of Smith whilst a boy.
