= Kirkharle Hall =

Former country house in Northumberland, England

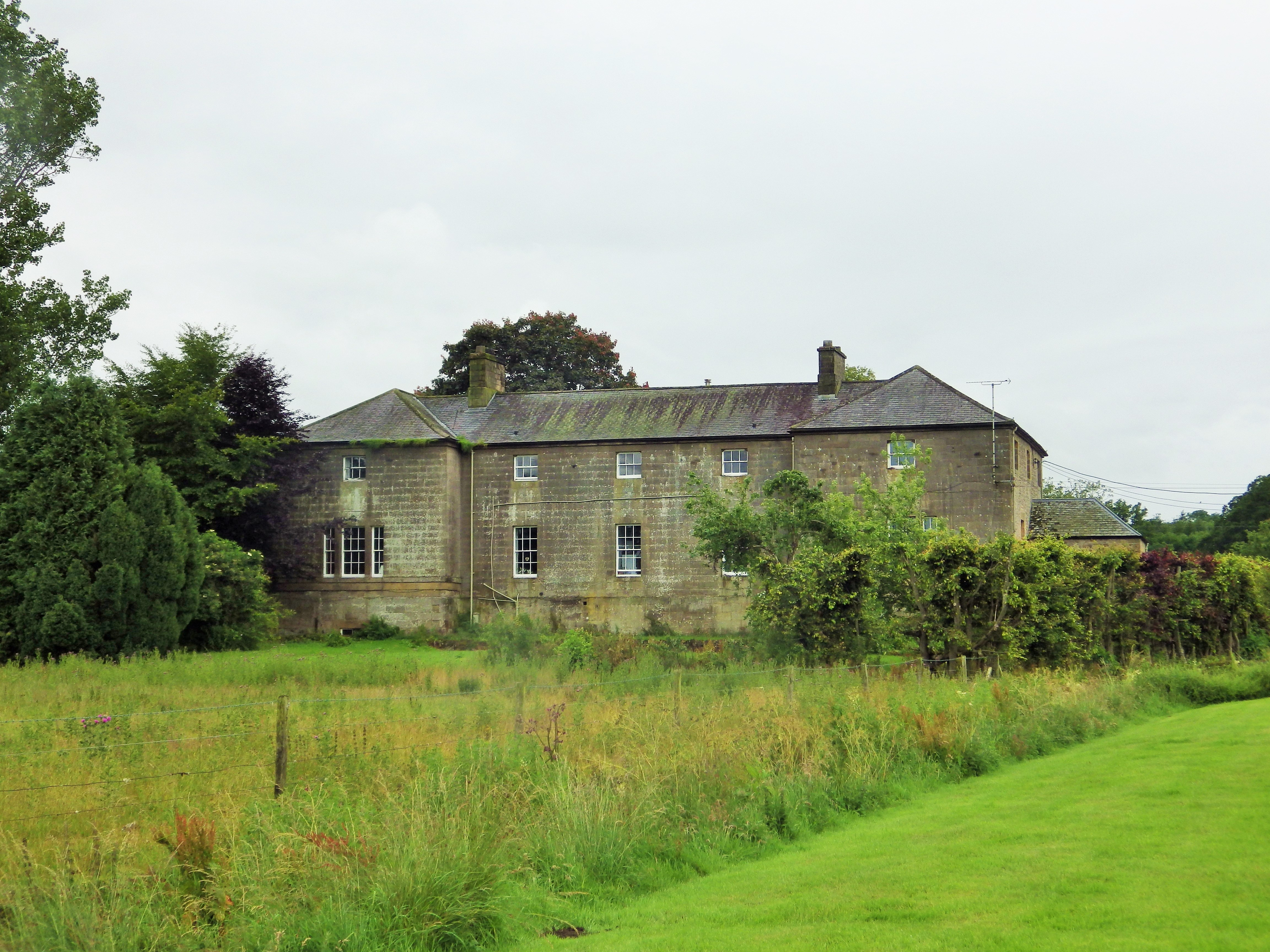
- Kirkharle Hall

- Location in Northumberland

General information
- Location: Northumberland, England, UK
- Coordinates: 55.136°N 1.980°W
- OS grid: NZ013824

Kirkharle Hall is a remnant of a country house at Kirkharle, Northumberland, England, the former seat of the Loraine family, now much reduced and in use as a farmhouse. The Hall is in the upper reaches of the Wansbeck valley; almost adjacent to the A696 road; 12 miles (19 km) west of Morpeth; and 2 miles (3.2 km) southeast of Kirkwhelpington.

== History ==
Kirkharle name was first recorded, as Herle in 1177, and derives either from the Old English "Herela-lea" which means "Herela's Grove" or from the Old English "herg-lea" which means "temple-grove" a place of worship for the pre-Christian Angles. Other early forms included Kyrkeherle (c.1250), Kyrkherll (1346) and Kirkehirle (1428), the "kirk" element denoting a "church." The Loraine Baronets acquired the manor by marriage from the De Harles, who owned it in the 14th century, and derived their name (literally "of Harle") from the village. Following its sale to a local farmer in the early 19th century the Hall was largely demolished. Only one wing was retained which was rebuilt as a farmhouse. It is a Grade II listed building.

Nearby stands a memorial stone erected in 1728 to replace an earlier memorial commemorating Robert Loraine who was killed by marauding Scots in 1483.

Among the quaint epitaphs in the church upon departed Loraines is the following: Here lyes the Body of Richard Loraine, Esq., who was a proper handsome man of good sense and behaviour : he dy'd a Batcheler of an Appoplexy walking in a green field near London, October 26th, 1738, in the 38 Year of his Age.

The surrounding parkland was designed in the 18th century by Capability Brown who was born at Kirkharle and who began his career as a gardener in the park while it was under the ownership of Sir William Loraine, 2nd Baronet. The park is a Registered Historic Park Grade II.

The present owner has redeveloped the farm and its outbuildings to create Kirkharle Courtyard, a development incorporating historical, retail and craft centres.
