= Percy Loraine =

British diplomat (1880–1961)

The Right Honourable Sir Percy Loraine Bt GCMG
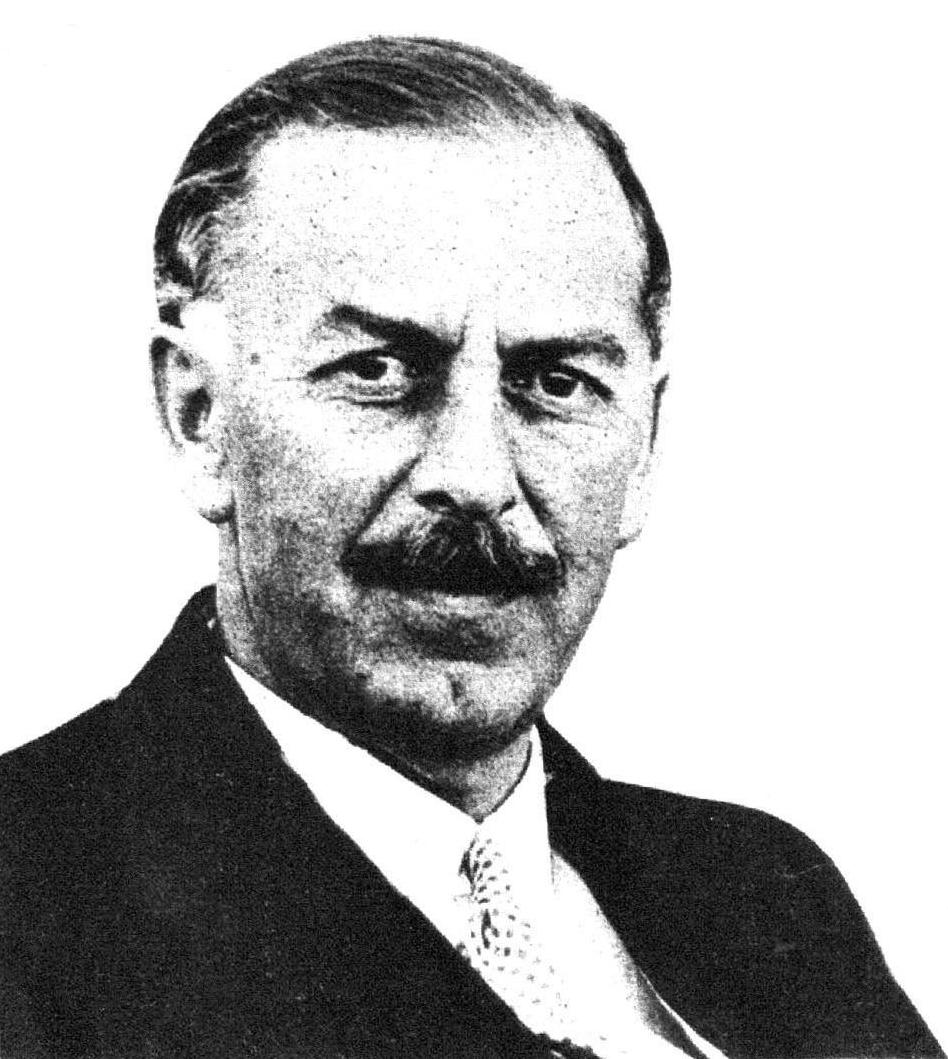

British Envoy Extraordinary and Minister Plenipotentiary to Iran
- In office 1921–1926
- Preceded by: Herman Norman
- Succeeded by: Robert Clive

British Envoy Extraordinary and Minister Plenipotentiary to Greece
- In office 1926–1929
- Preceded by: Milne Cheetham
- Succeeded by: Patrick Ramsay

British High Commissioner to Egypt
- In office 1929–1933
- Preceded by: George Lloyd
- Succeeded by: Miles Lampson

British Ambassador to Turkey
- In office 1933–1939
- Preceded by: George Clerk
- Succeeded by: Hughe Knatchbull-Hugessen

British Ambassador to Italy
- In office 1939–1940
- Preceded by: Eric Drummond
- Succeeded by: Suspended during World War II

Personal details
- Born: Percy Lyham Loraine; 5 November 1880 London, England
- Died: 23 May 1961 (aged 80) London, England
- Parents: Lambton Loraine (father); Frederica Mary Horatia (mother)
- Relatives: Eustace Loraine (brother)
- Occupation: Thoroughbred breeder

Sir Percy Lyham Loraine, 12th Baronet, GCMG (5 November 1880 – 23 May 1961) was a British diplomat. He was British High Commissioner to Egypt from 1929 to 1933, British Ambassador to Turkey from 1933 to 1939 and British Ambassador to Italy from 1939 to 1940. In later life he was involved in breeding thoroughbreds for horse racing and won the 2000 Guineas Stakes in 1954 with Darius. He was the last of the Loraine baronets, having no sons to succeed him.

== Early life ==
Loraine was born in London on 5 November 1880 the second son of Admiral Sir Lambton Loraine, the 11th Baronet and his wife Frederica Mary née Broke. Educated at Eton College from 1893 until 1899 when he went to New College, Oxford. In 1899 at the start of the Second Boer War he joined the Imperial Yeomanry and served on active duty in South Africa until 1902. In 1904, he joined the diplomatic service.

== Diplomatic career ==
He first served in the Middle East, at the British missions in Istanbul and Tehran, where he was Envoy Extraordinary and Minister Plenipotentiary 1921–26, before being posted in Rome, Peking, Paris and Madrid. He took part in the 1919 Paris Peace Conference which was held following the end of World War I, before being sent as minister in Tehran and then Athens.

In 1929, he was appointed as High Commissioner for Egypt and the Sudan. However, his policy of allowing King Fuad I to control the government led to his removal in 1933.

He became close to Turkish President Mustafa Kemal Atatürk while serving in Ankara, which improved the relations between the two countries. While ambassador, Loraine visited Atatürk on his deathbed and later gave a BBC broadcast paying tribute to Atatürk on the 10th anniversary of his death.

He was the last British ambassador to Italy before the start of World War II. On 10 June 1940, Loraine was presented with the Italian declaration of war on the United Kingdom by Galeazzo Ciano, the Italian Minister of Foreign Affairs; Loraine "did not bat an eyelid", as Ciano recorded in his diary.

Loraine was reputedly nicknamed 'pompous Percy' by his staff. Winston Churchill did not seek his advice on Middle Eastern matters during the war, and he retired from public life.

== Later life ==
Loraine retired from his diplomatic career in 1940. He took an interest in horse racing and thoroughbred horse breeding: his horse Darius won the 2000 Guineas in 1954. He worked for the Jockey Club on the introduction of photo-finish cameras to racing.

He died at his London home on 23 May 1961 aged 80. He had no children and the baronetcy became extinct.

== Honours ==
Loraine was appointed a Privy Counsellor in 1933, a CMG in the 1921 Birthday Honours, promoted to KCMG in the 1925 Birthday Honours and again to GCMG in the 1937 Coronation Honours.

== Personal life ==
His brother Eustace died unmarried in an aircraft accident 1912 so when his father died in 1917 he succeeded as the 12th baronet. In 1924 Percy Loraine married Louise Violet Beatrice, daughter of Major-General Edward Montagu-Stuart-Wortley, brother of the 2nd Earl of Wharncliffe. Sir Percy lived at Styford Hall, Stocksfield-on-Tyne, and at Wilton Crescent, Belgravia. His friends included Gertrude Bell, fellow diplomat Sir Lancelot Oliphant, and Sir Arnold Wilson.

Diplomatic posts
| Preceded by Herman Norman | British Envoy Extraordinary and Minister Plenipotentiary to Iran; 1921 – 1926 | Succeeded by Sir Robert Clive |
| Preceded by Sir Milne Cheetham | British Envoy Extraordinary and Minister Plenipotentiary to Greece; 1926 – 1929 | Succeeded by Hon. Patrick Ramsay |
| Preceded by George Lloyd | British High Commissioner to Egypt; 1929 – 1933 | Succeeded by Miles Lampson |
| Preceded by George Clerk | British Ambassador to Turkey; 1933 – 1939 | Succeeded by Sir Hughe Knatchbull-Hugessen |
| Preceded by Sir Eric Drummond | British Ambassador to Italy; 1939 – 1940 | Suspended World War II Title next held by Sir Noel Charles |
Baronetage of England
| Preceded by Lambton Loraine | Baronet (of Kirk Harle); 1917 – 1961 | Extinct |
