= Sir William Loraine, 2nd Baronet =

Sir William Loraine, 2nd Baronet (c. September 1658 – 22 January 1744) was an English lawyer and politician.

== Biography ==
Loraine was the eldest son of Sir Thomas Loraine, 1st Baronet and Grace, a daughter of Sir William Fenwick, 2nd Baronet. He was trained in law at Lincoln's Inn from 1678 and was called to the bar in 1692. He established a successful legal practice in London, before returning to Northumberland in 1694 to help manage his family's estates and delicate financial situation. During the 1690s, he was recorded as both a justice of the peace and a deputy lieutenant for Northumberland.

Loraine was elected to the House of Commons of England as a Member of Parliament for Northumberland at the November 1701 English general election with the support of Charles Seymour, 6th Duke of Somerset. He made only one recorded action in parliament; he acted as a teller alongside Sir Francis Blake in a vote on Irish forfeitures. His political inclinations are otherwise unknown. He did not stand for re-election at the 1702 English general election.

Outside parliament, Loraine devoted his energies into improving the Kirkharle Hall estate. In this regard, Capability Brown was hired as an apprentice to work on the estate, where he began his career as a gardener. Loraine remained a local magistrate for the rest of his life, and attempted to obstruct the progress of the Jacobite army in Northumberland during the Jacobite rising of 1715. He succeeded to his father's baronetcy in 1718.

Parliament of England
Preceded by Ferdinando Forster; Hon. William Howard	Member of Parliament for Northumberland; 1701–1702; With: Sir Francis Blake	Succeeded by Sir Francis Blake; Bertram Stote
Baronetage of England
Preceded by Thomas Loraine	Baronet (of Kirk Harle); 1718–1744	Succeeded by Charles Loraine
