= Sir Lambton Loraine, 11th Baronet =

Royal Navy admiral

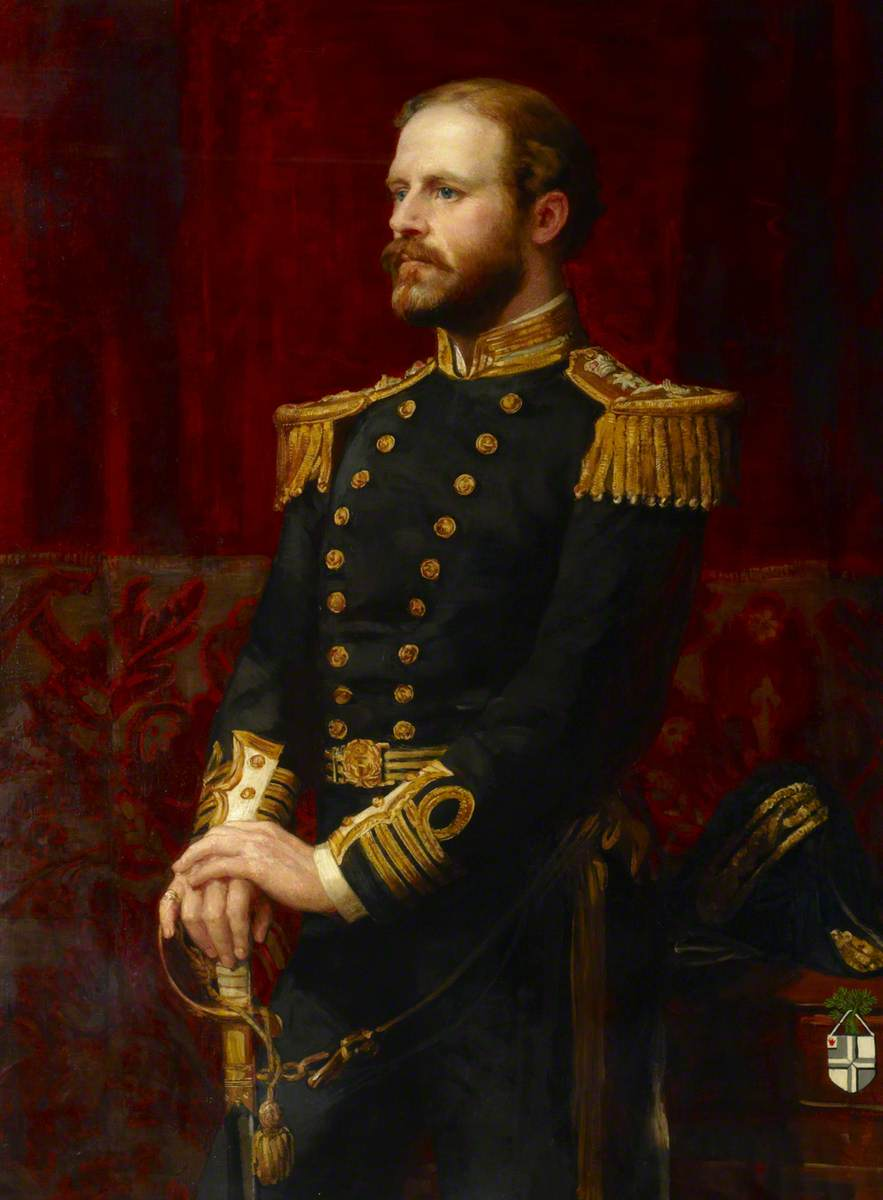
- Loraine as a captain (oil painting by Anna Lea Merritt)
- Born: 17 November 1838
- Died: 13 May 1917 (aged 78)
- Spouse: Frederica Mary Horatia (m. 1878–1917)
- Military career
- Allegiance: United Kingdom
- Branch: Royal Navy
- Service years: 1852–1885
- Rank: Rear-Admiral
- Commands: HMS Mutine; HMS Niobe
- Conflicts: Virginius Affair

Sir Lambton Loraine, 11th Baronet (17 November 1838 - 13 May 1917) was a British naval officer, involved in several incidents of gunboat diplomacy. He is best remembered for his involvement in the "Virginius Affair" of 1873.

In October of 1878, he married Frederica Mary Horatia (daughter of Captain Charles Acton Broke, R.E. (Bart)). They produced two sons; Eustace (b.1879), Percy (b.1880) and two daughters called Jacqueline and Isaura. The Baronet line passed to his second Son; Percy.

On 11 July 1852 he succeeded as 11th Baronet Loraine of Kirke Harle, Northumberland. In the same year he entered the Royal Navy, originally as a Naval Cadet, a Captain noting at the time "Sir Lambton Loraine Bart. Has very good talents, and promises to make a good draughtsman and surveyor." Sir Lambton joined HMS Trincomalee at Valparaíso in early 1853, at the age of 14 years, and was a Midshipman aboard the ship until 1857 at the end of her second commission based in the Pacific. He was promoted to Lieutenant in 1858 and served in the Mediterranean, then in 1864 he was appointed Flag-Lieutenant to Rear-Admiral the Hon. Joseph Denman, Commander-in-Chief, Pacific Station. In 1866 he was acting commander of HMS Mutine during the hostilities between Spain and her former colonies, Peru and Chile, then in 1867 he was promoted to Commander.

== Captain of Niobe ==
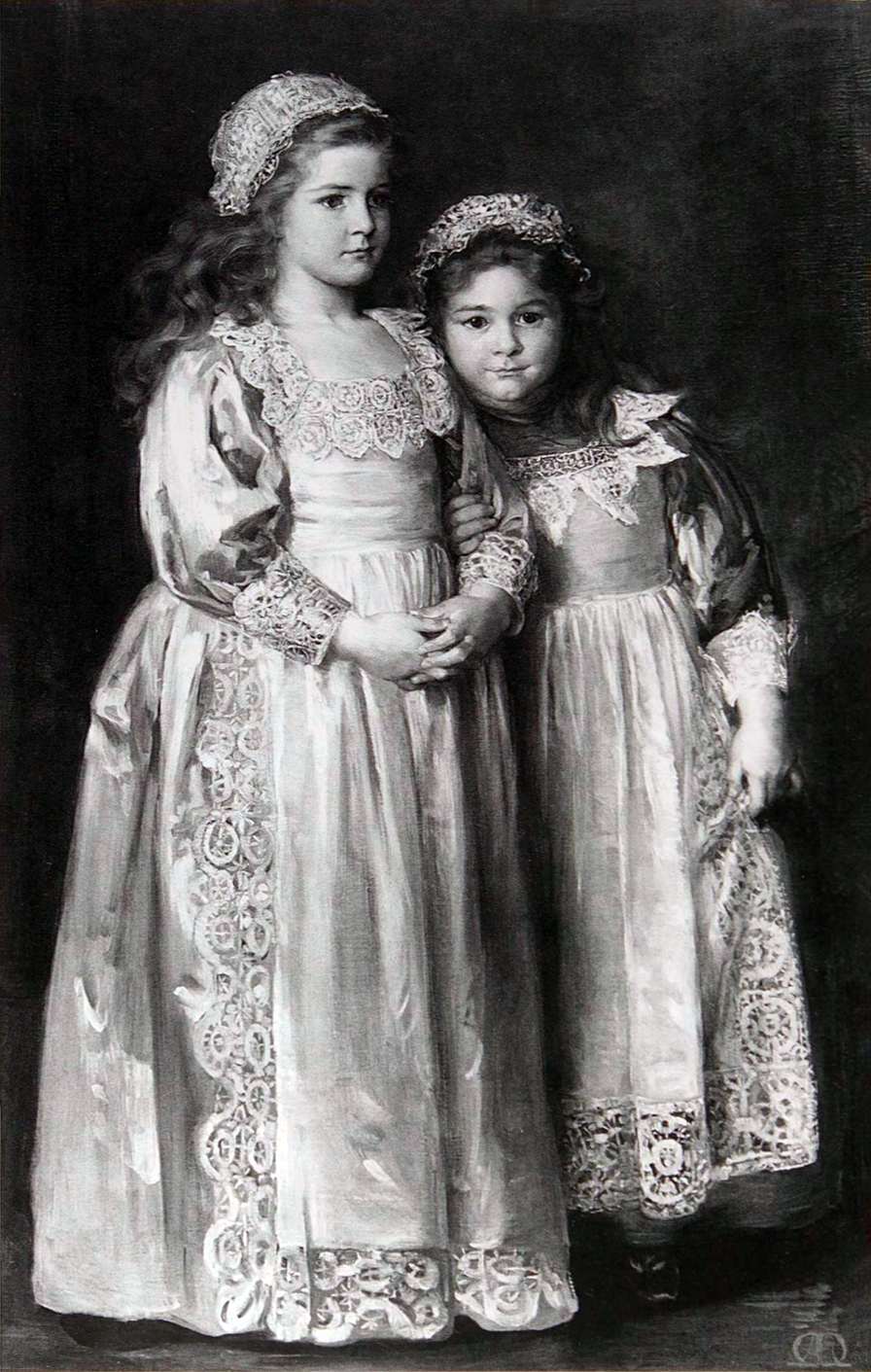
Portraits of his daughters, Jacqueline and Isaura Loraine by Anna Lea Merritt

Loraine commanded the sloop Niobe, based at Kingston, Jamaica. In May 1873, the governor of Puerto Plata, Dominican Republic broke into the local British consulate to arrest three asylum seekers. Loraine and the Niobe were summoned, and forced the governor to personally release the prisoners. The local Dominican troops were required to raise the Union Jack and honour it with a twenty-one gun salute.

In June 1873, the Niobe bombarded the Honduran fortress at Omoa, forcing the local commander to capitulate in a dispute with a British funded railway construction company.

== The Virginius Affair ==
Since October 1870 the ship, Virginius, a sidewheel steamer over 200 ft (61m) long, capable of remarkable speed due to its powerful engines, was used to transport arms and men to aid the insurgencies against Spain in Cuba and Venezuela. The ship was regarded by Spain as a pirate ship and had several narrow escapes.

On 23 October 1873 Virginius sailed from Kingston, Jamaica with 102 Cuban insurgents. At Port-au-Prince 300 Remingtons and 300,000 cartridges were loaded on board. At Comito 800 daggers, 800 machetes, a barrel of powder and a case of shoes were loaded. The ship headed for Cuba, but never reached shore. About 6 miles from land it was intercepted by the Spanish warship Tornado under the command of Captain Dionisio Costilla and an 8-hour sea chase ensued. During this chase, guns and equipment were dropped overboard to lighten the ship, however the poor physical condition of the ship and engines caused Captain Fry to surrender the ship barely 6 miles from the Jamaican coast.

On 2 November 1873 a council of war was held by Spanish officials after the arrival of the captured Virginius at Santiago de Cuba harbour. Four ranking officers of the Army of Liberation were executed at 6am on 4 November 1873. Following a court-martial on 7 November the captain of Virginius and 36 members of the crew were executed by firing squad the same day. A further 12 Cuban revolutionaries were executed the next day. It was Sir Lambton Loraine who intervened, arriving at Santiago de Cuba harbour as commander of Niobe. Loraine immediately sent the following communique to the Spanish Military Commander of Santiago, General Burriel:

Military Commander of Santiago – Sir: I have no orders from my government, because they are not aware of what is happening; but I assume the responsibility and I am convinced that my conduct will be approved by Her Britannic Majesty, because my actions are pro-humanity and pro-civilisation, I demand that you stop this dreadful butchery that is taking place here. I do not believe that I need explain what my actions will be in case my demand is not heeded. (signed) Lambton Loraine

In 1873, he was awarded with the 'freedom of the city of New York' for services rendered to the United States.

Loraine delivered the letter personally and did not leave the office of the military Governor until he received a satisfactory reply. His valiant intervention stopped the executing cold, and thus many Cubans, Americans and Britons were saved by his action. In April 1874, this Captain now, whom had spent his teenage years on HMS Trincomalee, was in New York for 13 days during which he was a welcome recipient of an almost continued round of receptions and evidences of public and private esteem.

On 25 April he departed New York, the New York Times reporting:

The vessel moved out of her dock a few minutes after 1 o’clock, Sir Lambton standing by the gangway with his umbrella raised, puffing quietly on his cigar and waving adieus with his hat to the little groups of friends on the pier, who sent him off with a hearty cheer.

== Later life ==
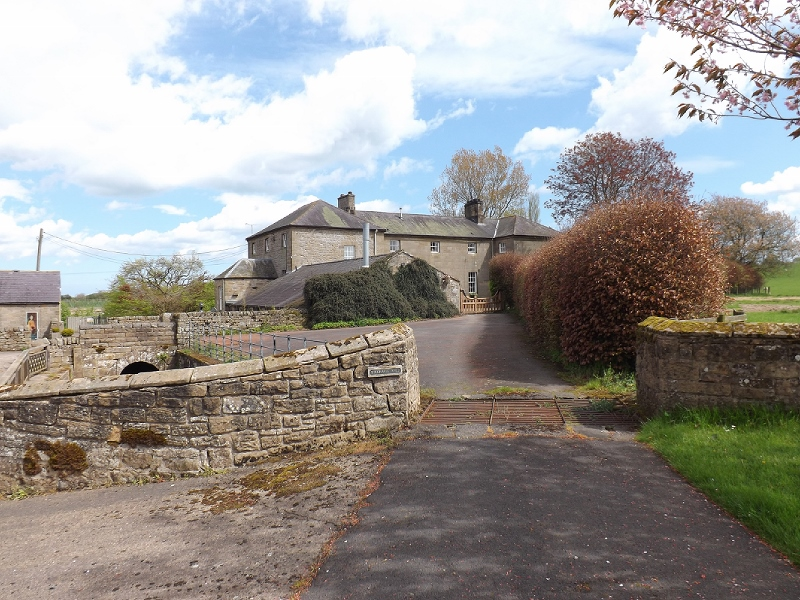
Kirkharle Hall Northumbria. Previously a family seat for the Loraines

Sir Lambton became a retired captain in 1885, and a retired rear-admiral in 1889, dying at the age of 78 on 13 May 1917.

He was the father of British diplomat Sir Percy Loraine (1880-1961).

== See also ==
- Loraine baronets
- HMS Trincomalee

Baronetage of England
Preceded by John Loraine	Baronet (of Kirk Harle); 1852–1917	Succeeded by Percy Loraine
