= Tom Turner =

British landscape architect

- Born: 5 May 1946 (age 78); Woking, United Kingdom
- Occupation: Architect

Tom Turner is an English landscape architect, garden designer and garden historian formerly teaching at the University of Greenwich in London. He is the author of books and articles on landscape and gardens and is the editor of the Garden History Reference Encyclopedia. Educated at the Universities of St Andrews and Edinburgh, he studied landscape architecture under Frank Clark.

== Published works ==
- Suez Canal Regional Plan Volume 4 Environment (United Nations Development Programme, Cairo, 1977)
- Landscape Design for the Middle East, Chapter on 'The design of open space' in book edited by Jane Brown and Timothy Cochrane (RIBA Publications, 1978)
- Colour Schemes for the Flower Garden, Preface to 1982 edition of Gertrude Jekyll's book (Antique Collectors Club, 1982)
- Loudon's stylistic development Journal of Garden History 1982, Vol. 2, No. 2, pp. 175–188.
- Landscape planning: a linguistic and historical analysis of the term's use, Landscape Planning 9, (1982/3) pp. 179–192.
- London Landscape Guide (Landscape Institute, 1983) with Simon Rendel.
- Landscape planning: the need to train specialists' Landscape Planning 11 (1984) pp. 33–36.
- Comment on Philip Dearden "Factors influencing landscape preferences: an empirical investigation", Landscape Planning 12, (1985) pp. 93–94.
- English Garden Design: history and styles since 1650 (Antique Collectors Club, 1986). ISBN 0-907462-25-1
- Landscape Planning (Hutchinson Education, 1987). ISBN 0-09-164710-X
- Urban Parks, The Landscape Institute, December 1992.
- Open space planning in London: from standards per 1000 to green strategy, Town Planning Review October 64 (4) 1992 pp. 365–386.
- GIS and the "Future of Planning"' Planning Practice and Research Vol. 9, No. 4, pp. 347–351 December 1994
- Greenways, blueways, skyways and other ways to a better London Landscape and Urban Planning 33 (1995) pp. 269–282
- GIS and the rebirth of ‘planning’ Urban Studies, Vol. 1, No. 1 Autumn 1995
- River reclamation, with GIS Built Environment, Vol. 21, No. 1, 1995
- Western Europe, current city expansion and the use of GIS Robert Holden and Tom Turner, Landscape and Urban Planning 36 (1997) pp. 315–326.
- City as Landscape: a post-Postmodern view of design and planning (Spons, 1996) ISBN 0-419-20410-5
- Public Open Space: planning and management with GIS (Greenwich University Press, 1998) ISBN 1-86166-100-2
- Landscape Planning and Environmental Impact Design (UCL Press 1998) ISBN 1-85728-321-X HB
- Garden History Reference Encyclopedia CD (2002) ISBN 0-9542306-0-4
- Garden Design: Philosophy and Design 2000 BC-2000 AD, Routledge (2005) ISBN 978-0-415-31749-8
- Asian Gardens: history, belief and design (2010) ISBN 978-0-415-49687-2 Routledge
- European Gardens: History, Philosophy and Design (2011) ISBN 978-0-415-49684-1 Routledge
- London Gardens Walk - Design & History Tour (2012)
- British Gardens: History, philosophy and design (2013) ISBN 978-0415518789 Routledge
- THE CLAUDIANS: John Claudius Loudon and Claudius Buchanan: The Dramatic Lives of Two Visionaries in the Age of Enlightenment: gardens, landscapes, reason & faith Gardenvisit.com (2024) ASIN : [B0DJL69B9H] (https://www.amazon.com/dp/B0DJL69B9H)
