= Loraine baronets =

Extinct baronetcy in the Baronetage of England

- Escutcheon of the Loraine baronets of Kirk Harle (1664)
- Creation date: 1664
- Status: extinct
- Extinction date: 1961
- Seat: Kirkharle Hall
- Motto: Lauro scutoque resurgo, Arise again with laurel and shield

The Loraine Baronetcy, of Kirk Harle in the County of Northumberland, was a title in the Baronetage of England. It was created on 26 September 1664 for Thomas Loraine, High Sheriff of Northumberland. The second Baronet was Member of Parliament for Northumberland. The third Baronet was High Sheriff of Northumberland in 1742, the fourth Baronet in 1774 and the fifth Baronet in 1814. The eleventh Baronet was a rear admiral in the Royal Navy. The twelfth baronet was a distinguished diplomat. The title became extinct on his death in 1961.

The Loraines held a Northumbrian estate at Kirkharle Hall that was acquired when William Loraine married the Strother heiress of Kirk Harle early in the 15th century. Capability Brown was born in the nearby village of Kirkharle, and was employed as a youth on the estate by the second Baronet.

== Loraine baronets, of Kirk Harle (1664) ==
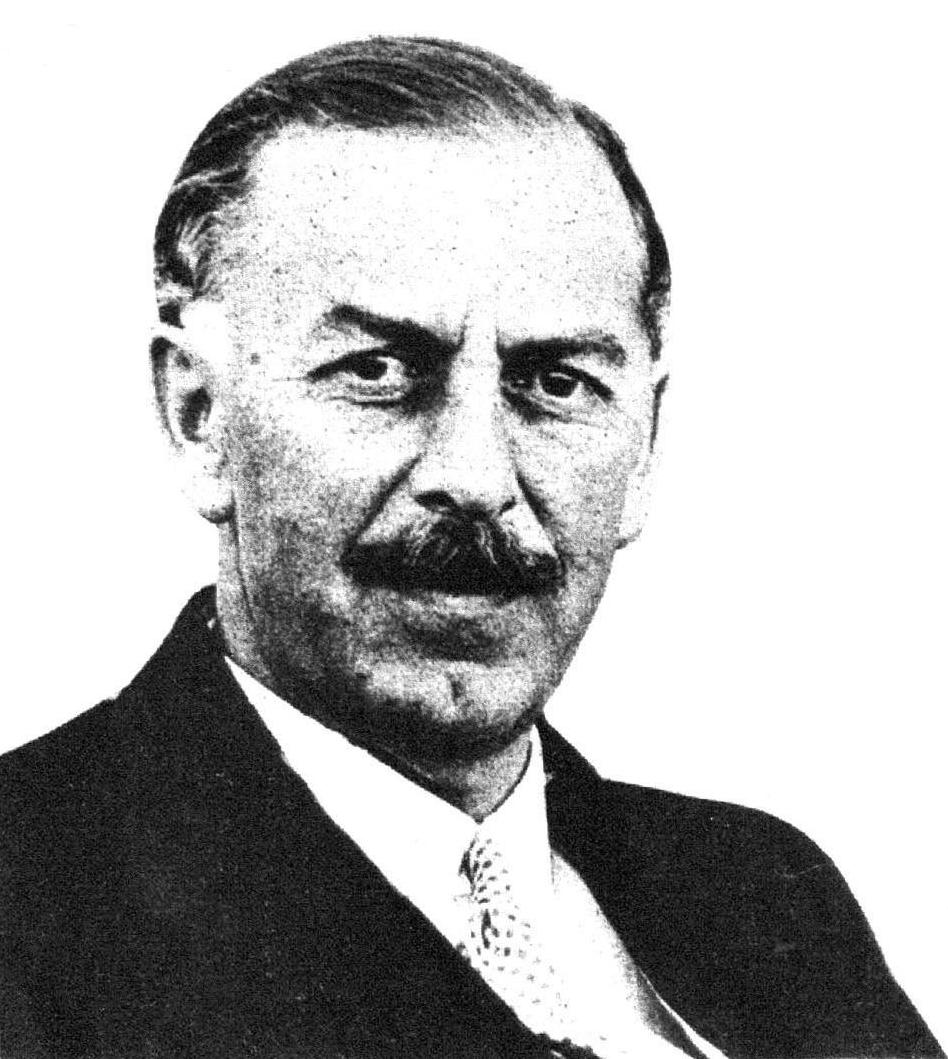
Sir Percy Loraine, 12th Baronet

- Sir Thomas Loraine, 1st Baronet (1638–1718)
- Sir William Loraine, 2nd Baronet (1658–1744)
- Sir Charles Loraine, 3rd Baronet (1701–1755)
- Sir William Loraine, 4th Baronet (1749–1809)
- Sir Charles Loraine, 5th Baronet (1779–1833)
- Sir William Loraine, 6th Baronet (1801–1849)
- Sir Charles Vincent Loraine, 7th Baronet (1807–1850)
- Sir Henry Claude Loraine, 8th Baronet (1812–1851)
- Sir William Loraine, 9th Baronet (1780–1851)
- Sir John Lambton Loraine, 10th Baronet (1784–1852)
- Sir Lambton Loraine, 11th Baronet (1838–1917)
- Sir Percy Lyham Loraine, 12th Baronet (1880–1961)
